= Gate array =

Type of integrated circuit

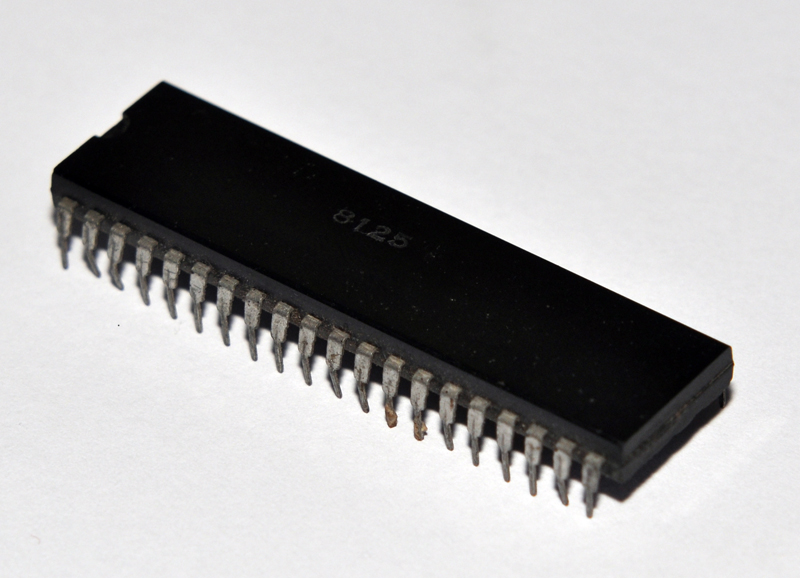
Sinclair ZX81 ULA

A gate array is a type of semi-custom application-specific integrated circuit (ASIC). The manufacturer fabricates a base wafer containing a regular array of transistors before the customer's circuit is known. To create a particular chip, the factory adds customer-specific metal interconnect layers that join those transistors into logic gates and larger functions.

Because most fabrication steps are shared among many designs, gate arrays require fewer custom photomasks than fully customized integrated circuits. This lowers non-recurring engineering costs and can shorten manufacturing time, but the fixed transistor layout and routing overhead generally make the result larger and slower than a more fully customized design.

Similar technologies have also been used for analog and mixed-signal circuits, although these are not generally called gate arrays. Gate arrays have also been known as uncommitted logic arrays (ULAs), which could include linear circuit functions, and as semi-custom chips.

== Design and manufacture ==
A gate-array vendor can manufacture and stockpile base wafers with the diffusion and polysilicon layers already complete. A customer's circuit is represented as a netlist, and electronic design automation tools map that netlist onto the available transistors, place its functions, and route the connections. Only the contact and metal-layer masks need to be made for the individual design. Early software for logic simulation, test generation, placement, and routing of gate arrays helped establish the foundations of the EDA industry.

In a channeled gate array, rows of transistors are separated by spaces reserved for wiring. A channelless array, also called a sea-of-gates, places transistors across most of the chip and routes wires over transistors that are not used by the circuit. Sea-of-gates designs offer greater density, but their routing is more complex.

A gate array differs from a field-programmable gate array (FPGA) in when and how its connections are configured. An FPGA is programmed by the customer after manufacture and can usually be reprogrammed; a mask-programmed gate array is completed at the factory and a change to its connections requires new manufacturing masks. The programmability of an FPGA adds area and performance overhead, while avoiding the gate array's custom-mask cost for low-volume designs.

== History ==
=== Development ===
Gate arrays had several concurrent development paths. Ferranti in the UK pioneered commercializing bipolar ULA technology, offering circuits of "100 to 10,000 gates and above" by 1983, although in practice delivering products with 4,000 gates at that time. The company's early lead in semi-custom chips, with the initial application of a ULA integrated circuit involving a camera from Rollei in 1972, expanding to "practically all European camera manufacturers" as users of the technology, led to the company's dominance in this particular market throughout the 1970s. However, by 1982, as many as 30 companies had started to compete with Ferranti, reducing the company's market share to around 30 percent. Ferranti's "major competitors" were other British companies such as Marconi and Plessey, both of which had licensed technology from another British company, Micro Circuit Engineering. A contemporary initiative, UK5000, also sought to produce a CMOS gate array with "5,000 usable gates", with involvement from British Telecom and a number of other major British technology companies.

IBM developed proprietary bipolar master slices that it used in mainframe manufacturing in the late 1970s and early 1980s, but never commercialized them externally. Fairchild Semiconductor also flirted briefly in the late 1960s with bipolar arrays diode–transistor logic and transistor-transistor logic called Micromosaic and Polycell.

CMOS (complementary metal–oxide–semiconductor) technology opened the door to the broad commercialization of gate arrays. The first CMOS gate arrays were developed by Robert Lipp in 1974 for International Microcircuits, Inc. (IMI) a Sunnyvale photo-mask shop started by Frank Deverse, Jim Tuttle and Charlie Allen, ex-IBM employees. This first product line employed 7.5 micron single-level metal CMOS technology and ranged from 50 to 400 gates. Computer-aided design (CAD) technology at the time was very rudimentary due to the low processing power available, so the design of these first products was only partially automated.

This product pioneered several features that went on to become standard in future designs. The most important were: the strict organization of n-channel and p-channel transistors in 2–3 row pairs across the chip; and running all interconnect on grids rather than minimum custom spacing, which had been the standard until then. This later innovation paved the way to full automation when coupled with the development of 2-layer CMOS arrays. Customizing these first parts was somewhat tedious and error-prone due to the lack of good software tools. IMI tapped into PC board development techniques to minimize manual customization effort. Chips at the time were designed by hand, drawing all components and interconnecting on precision gridded Mylar sheets, using colored pencils to delineate each processing layer. Rubylith sheets were then cut and peeled to create a (typically) 200× to 400× scale representation of the process layer. This was then photo-reduced to make a 1× mask. Digitization rather than rubylith cutting was just coming in as the latest technology, but initially, it only removed the rubylith stage; drawings were still manual and then "hand" digitized. PC boards, meanwhile, had moved from custom rubylith to PC tape for interconnects. IMI created to-scale photo enlargements of the base layers. Using decals of logic gate connections and PC tape to interconnect these gates, custom circuits could be quickly laid out by hand for these relatively small circuits, and photo-reduced using existing technologies.

After a falling out with IMI, Robert Lipp went on to start California Devices, Inc. (CDI) in 1978 with two silent partners, Bernie Aronson, and Brian Tighe. CDI quickly developed a product line competitive to IMI and, shortly thereafter, a 5-micron silicon gate single-layer product line with densities of up to 1,200 gates. A couple of years later, CDI followed up with "channel-less" gate arrays that reduced the row blockages caused by a more complex silicon underlayer that pre-wired the individual transistor connections to locations needed for common logic functions, simplifying the first-level metal interconnect. This increased chip densities by 40%, significantly reducing manufacturing costs.

=== Innovation ===
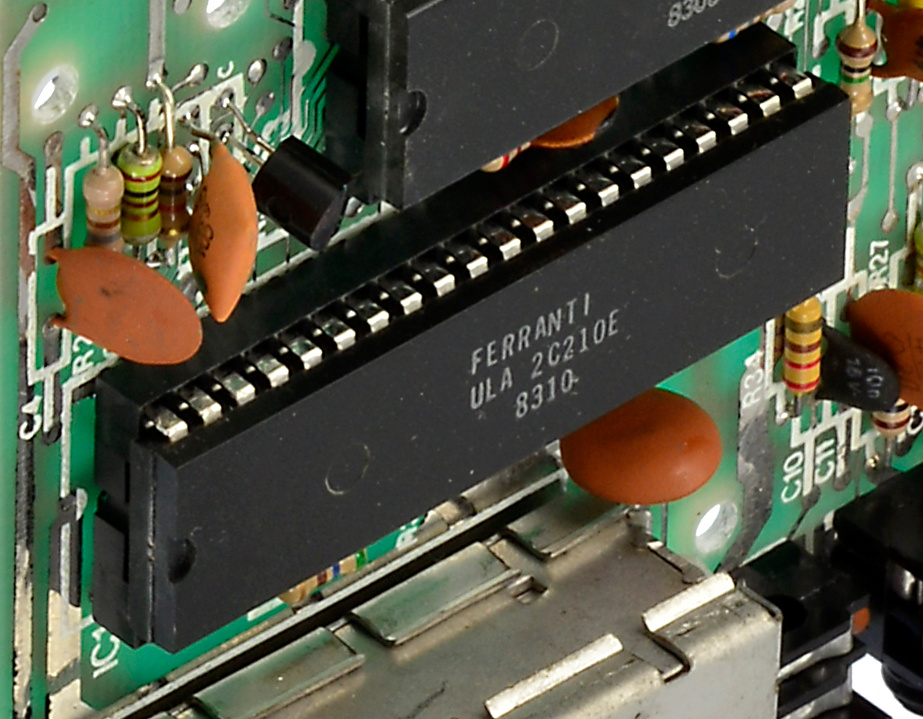
Ferranti ULA 2C210E on a Timex Sinclair 1000 motherboard

Early gate arrays were low-performance and relatively large and expensive compared to state-of-the-art n-MOS technology then being used for custom chips. CMOS technology was being driven by very low-power applications such as watch chips and battery-operated portable instrumentation, not performance. They were also well under the performance of the existing dominant logic technology, transistor–transistor logic. However, there were many niche applications where they were invaluable, particularly in low power, size reduction, portable and aerospace applications as well as time-to-market sensitive products. Even these small arrays could replace a board full of transistor–transistor logic gates if performance were not an issue. A common application was combining a number of smaller circuits that were supporting a larger LSI circuit on a board was affectionately known as "garbage collection". And the low cost of development and custom tooling made the technology available to the most modest budgets. Early gate arrays played a large part in the CB craze in the 1970s as well as a vehicle for the introduction of other later mass-produced products such as modems and cell phones.

By the early 1980s, gate arrays were starting to move out of their niche applications to the general market. Several factors in technology and markets were converging. Size and performance were increasing; automation was maturing; the technology became "hot" when in 1981 IBM introduced its new flagship 3081 mainframe with CPU comprising gate arrays. They were used in a consumer product, the ZX81, and new entrants to the market increased visibility and credibility.

In 1981, Wilfred Corrigan, Bill O'Meara, Rob Walker, and Mitchell "Mick" Bohn founded LSI Logic. Their initial intention was to commercialize emitter coupled logic gate arrays, but discovered the market was quickly moving towards CMOS. Instead, they licensed CDI's silicon gate CMOS line as a second source. This product established them in the market while they developed their own proprietary 5-micron 2-layer metal line. This latter product line was the first commercial gate array product amenable to full automation. LSI developed a suite of proprietary development tools that allowed users to design their own chip from their own facility by remote login to LSI Logic's system.

Sinclair Research ported an enhanced ZX80 design to a ULA chip for the ZX81, and later used a ULA in the ZX Spectrum. A compatible chip was made in Russia as T34VG1. Acorn Computers used several ULA chips in the BBC Micro, and later a single ULA for the Acorn Electron. Many other manufacturers from the time of the home computer boom period used ULAs in their machines. The IBM PC took over much of the personal computer market, and the sales volumes made full-custom chips more economical. Commodore's Amiga series used gate arrays for the Gary and Gayle custom chips, as their code names may suggest.

In an attempt to reduce the costs and increase the accessibility of gate array design and production, Ferranti introduced in 1982 a computer-aided design tool for their uncommitted logic array (ULA) product called ULA Designer. Although costing £46,500 to acquire, this tool promised to deliver reduced costs of around £5,000 per design plus manufacturing costs of £1-2 per chip in high volumes, in contrast to the £15,000 design costs incurred by engaging Ferranti's services for the design process. Based on a PDP-11/23 minicomputer running RSX/11M, together with graphical display, keyboard, "digitalizing board", control desk and optional plotter, the solution aimed to satisfy the design needs of gate arrays from 100 to 10,000 gates, with the design being undertaken entirely by the organisation acquiring the solution, starting with a "logic plan", proceeding through the layout of the logic in the gate array itself, and concluding with the definition of a test specification for verification of the logic and for establishing an automated testing regime. Verification of completed designs was performed by "external specialists" after the transfer of the design to a "CAD center" in Manchester, England or Sunnyvale, California, potentially over the telephone network. Prototyping completed designs took an estimated 3 to 4 weeks. The minicomputer itself was also adaptable to run as a laboratory or office system where appropriate.

Ferranti followed up on the ULA Designer with the Silicon Design System product based on the VAX-11/730 with 1 MB of RAM, 120 MB Winchester disk, and utilising a high-resolution display driven by a graphics unit with 500 KB of its own memory for "high speed windowing, painting, and editing capabilities". The software itself was available separately for organisations already likely to be using VAX-11/780 systems to provide a multi-user environment, but the "standalone system" package of hardware and software was intended to provide a more affordable solution with a "faster response" during the design process. The suite of tools involved in the use of the product included logic entry and test schedule definition (using Ferranti's own description languages), logic simulation, layout definition and checking, and mask generation for prototype gate arrays. The system also sought to support completely auto-routed designs, utilising architectural features of Ferranti's auto-routable (AR) arrays to deliver a "100-percent success auto-layout system" with this convenience incurring an increase in silicon area of approximately 25 percent.

Other British companies developed products for gate array design and fabrication. Qudos Limited, a spin-off from Cambridge University, offered a chip design product called Quickchip available for VAX and MicroVAX II systems and as a complete $11,000 turnkey solution, providing a suite of tools broadly similar to those of Ferranti's products including automatic layout, routing, rule checking and simulation functionality for the design of gate arrays. Qudos employed electron beam lithography, etching designs onto Ferranti ULA devices that formed the physical basis of these custom chips. Typical prototype production costs were stated as £100 per chip. Quickchip was subsequently ported to the Acorn Cambridge Workstation, with a low-end version for the BBC Micro, and to the Acorn Archimedes.

=== Alternatives ===
Indirect competition arose with the development of the field-programmable gate array (FPGA). Xilinx was founded in 1984, and its first products were much like early gate arrays, slow and expensive, fit only for some niche markets. However, Moore's law quickly made them a force and, by the early 1990s, were seriously disrupting the gate array market.

Designers still wished for a way to create their own complex chips without the expense of full-custom design, and eventually, this wish was granted with the arrival of not only the FPGA, but complex programmable logic device (CPLD), metal configurable standard cells (MCSC), and structured ASICs. Whereas a gate array required a back-end semiconductor wafer foundry to deposit and etch the interconnections, the FPGA and CPLD had user-programmable interconnections. Today's approach is to make the prototypes by FPGAs, as the risk is low and the functionality can be verified quickly. For smaller devices, production costs are sufficiently low. But for large FPGAs, production is very expensive, power-hungry, and in many cases, do not reach the required speed. To address these issues, several ASIC companies like BaySand, Faraday, Gigoptics, and others offer FPGA to ASIC conversion services.

=== Decline ===
While the market boomed, profits for the industry were lacking. Semiconductors underwent a series of rolling recessions during the 1980s that created a boom-bust cycle. The 1980 and 1981–1982 general recessions were followed by high-interest rates that curbed capital spending. This reduction played havoc on the semiconductor business, which at the time was highly dependent on capital spending. Manufacturers desperate to keep their fab plants full and afford constant modernization in a fast-moving industry became hyper-competitive. The many new entrants to the market drove gate array prices down to the marginal costs of the silicon manufacturers. Fabless companies such as LSI Logic and CDI survived on selling design services and computer time rather than on production revenues.

As of the early 21st century, the gate array market was a remnant of its former self, driven by the FPGA conversions done for cost or performance reasons. IMI moved out of gate arrays into mixed-signal circuits and was later acquired by Cypress Semiconductor in 2001; CDI closed its doors in 1989; and LSI Logic abandoned the market in favor of standard products and was eventually acquired by Broadcom.

== Design ==
A gate array is a prefabricated silicon chip with most transistors having no predetermined function. These transistors can be connected by metal layers to form standard NAND or NOR logic gates. These logic gates can then be further interconnected into a complete circuit on the same or later metal layers. The creation of a circuit with a specified function is accomplished by adding this final layer or layers of metal interconnects to the chip late in the manufacturing process, allowing the function of the chip to be customized as desired. These layers are analogous to the copper layers of a printed circuit board.

The earliest gate arrays comprised bipolar transistors, usually configured as high-performance transistor–transistor logic, emitter-coupled logic, or current-mode logic logic configurations. CMOS (complementary metal–oxide–semiconductor) gate arrays were later developed and came to dominate the industry.

Gate array master slices with unfinished chips arrayed across a wafer are usually prefabricated and stockpiled in large quantities regardless of customer orders. The design and fabrication according to the individual customer specifications can be finished in a shorter time than standard cell or full custom design. The gate array approach reduces the non-recurring engineering mask costs as fewer custom masks need to be produced. In addition, manufacturing test tooling lead time and costs are reduced — the same test fixtures can be used for all gate array products manufactured on the same die size. Gate arrays were the predecessor of the more complex structured ASIC; unlike gate arrays, structured ASICs tend to include predefined or configurable memories and/or analog blocks.

An application circuit must be built on a gate array that has enough gates, wiring, and I/O pins. Since requirements vary, gate arrays usually come in families, with larger members having more of all resources, but correspondingly more expensive. While the designer can fairly easily count how many gates and I/Os pins are needed, the number of routing tracks needed may vary considerably even among designs with the same amount of logic. (For example, a crossbar switch requires much more routing than a systolic array with the same gate count.) Since unused routing tracks increase the cost (and decrease the performance) of the part without providing any benefit, gate array manufacturers try to provide just enough tracks so that most designs that will fit in terms of gates and I/O pins can be routed. This is determined by estimates such as those derived from Rent's rule or by experiments with existing designs.

The main drawbacks of gate arrays are their somewhat lower density and performance compared with other approaches to ASIC design. However, this style is often a viable approach for low production volumes.

== Uses ==
Gate arrays were used widely in the home computers in the early to mid 1980s, including in the ZX81, ZX Spectrum, BBC Micro, Acorn Electron, Advance 86, and Commodore Amiga.

In the 1980s, the Forth Novix N4016 and HP 3000 Series 37 CPUs, both stack machines were implemented by gate arrays as were some graphic terminal functions. Some supporting hardware in at least 1990s DEC and HP servers was implemented by gate arrays.
