= Full custom =

Designing an integrated circuit from the ground up

In integrated circuit design, full-custom is a design methodology in which the layout of each individual transistor on the integrated circuit (IC), and the interconnections between them, are specified. Alternatives to full-custom design include various forms of semi-custom design, such as the repetition of small transistor subcircuits; one such methodology is the use of standard cell libraries (which are themselves designed full-custom).

Full-custom design potentially maximizes the performance of the chip, and minimizes its area, but is extremely labor-intensive to implement. Full-custom design is limited to ICs that are to be fabricated in extremely high volumes, notably certain microprocessors and a small number of application-specific integrated circuits (ASICs).

As of 2008 the main factor affecting the design and production of ASICs was the high cost of mask sets (number of which are depending on the number of IC layers) and the requisite EDA design tools. The mask sets are required in order to transfer the ASIC designs onto the wafer.

== See also ==
- Electronics design flow
