= RDR =

RDR may refer to:

== Entertainment ==
- Red Dead, a series of western-themed video game published by Rockstar Games, has included several games with the initials "RDR" including Red Dead Revolver, Red Dead Redemption, and Red Dead Redemption 2.

== Military ==
- Grand Forks Air Force Base (IATA airport code)
- Rhodesian Defence Regiment, Rhodesian Security Forces unit
- Royal Durban Rifles, now the Durban Light Infantry

== Organizations ==
- Rassemblement Démocratique pour la République, a political party in the Democratic Republic of the Congo
- Rassemblement Démocratique pour le Rwanda, also known as "Rassemblement Démocratique pour la Retour", an insurgent group in Rwanda
- Rassemblement des Républicains, a political party in Côte d'Ivoire
- Rat für deutsche Rechtschreibung (RdR), German-language regulator
- Retail Distribution Review, a review carried out by the UK Financial Services Authority into the advising of retail investment products

== Science and technology ==
- Restrictive design rules, a way for a semiconductor fabrication to ensure acceptable yield on its most advanced integrated circuits
- Ripple down rules, a knowledge acquisition methodology
- RNA-dependent RNA polymerase, an enzyme for RNA production

== Transportation ==
- Radyr railway station (National Rail station code)
- Royal Deeside Railway, a heritage railway in Scotland

== Other ==
- Rangitata Diversion Race, South Island, New Zealand
- Registered Diplomate Reporter, a certification offered by the National Court Reporters Association
- Reinier de Ridder, a Dutch mixed martial artist
