= Universal Test Specification Language =

Programming language

Universal Test Specification Language (UTSL) is a programming language used to describe ASIC tests in a format that leads to an automated translation of the test specification into an executable test code. UTSL is platform independent and provided a code generation interface for a specific platform is available, UTSL code can be translated into the programming language of a specific Automatic Test Equipment (ATE).

== History ==
Increased complexity of ASICs leads to requirements of more complex test programs with longer development times. An automated test program generation could simplify and speed up this process. Teradyne Inc. together with Robert Bosch GmbH agreed to develop a concept and a tool chain for automated test-program generation. To achieve this a tester independent programming language was required. Hence, UTSL, a programming language that enables detailed description of tests that can be translated into the ATE specific programming language was developed. The ATE manufacturers need to provide a Test Program Generator that uses the UTSL test description as inputs and generates the ATE-specific test code with optimal resource mapping and better practice program code.

As long as the ATE manufacturer provides with the test program generator that can use UTSL as an input the cumbersome task of translating a test program from one platform to another can be significantly simplified. In other words, the task of rewriting of the test programs for a specific platform can be replaced by automatically generating the code from the UTSL based test specification. Prerequisite for this is that the UTSL description of tests is sufficiently detailed with definition of the test technique as well as the description of all the necessary inputs and outputs.

Being a platform independent programming language, UTSL allows the engineers to read, analyse and modify the tests in the test specification regardless of the ATE at which the testing of the ASIC will be done. UTSL is based on C# and allows procedural programming and is class oriented. The classes contain sub-classes which in term have their sub-classes.

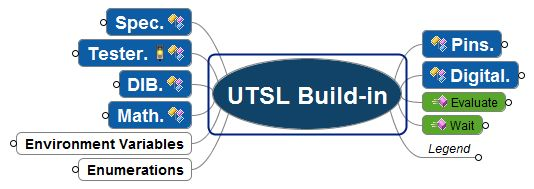

UTSL contains high amount of commands and test-functions. It also allows the usage of commonly known high level programming language syntax elements such as "if/then/else" , etc.

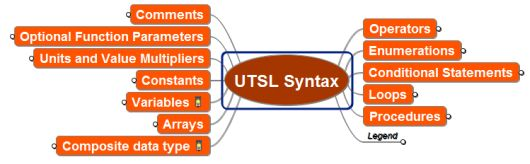

== Design ==
UTSL is a C# like language where the test are defined as blocks of code. Simple tests such a forcing current and measuring voltage or vice versa can be written in UTSL and with the means of the ATE (Automatic Test Equipment) specific code generator translated into testable code (see the picture1).

UTSL allows the user to set the instruments ranges and clamps in order to guarantee the measurement precision and to prevent the measurements from exceeding the instrument clamp values. The current UTSL capabilities can cover c.a. 70% of the required test specification for ASIC testing. For the remaining 30% one could use the option of writing comments in an informal form as it was done in the past.

UTSL supports language features such as:

  Flow control - "if/then/else, select/case" 
  Loops - "for, while, for each" 
  Data types - "int, double, bool, string" 
  Numerical operators - "=, +, -, *, /, %, **, --, &, |, <<, >>" 
  Logical operators - "==, <, >, >=, <=, !=, ^" 
  Arrays - "declare, resize, and [] operator" 

Furthermore, specialized classes for testing were added:

  Pin and PinList classes - "for the test board specifics" 
  TestEnvironment class - "wafer level vs final testing" 
  SerialPort and SerialDataFrame classes - "for device serial communications" 
  Evaluate class - "data-logs the results and compares the results to the defined limits" 

UTSL also supports the units and scales wherever floating point numbers are used. This is essential for a language that describes a test program where the values can be returned as "V, mV, uV, A, mA, uA" , etc.

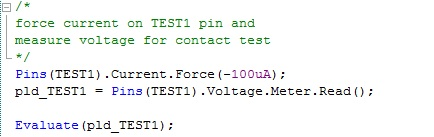
picture1

Also more complex tests such as serial communications with ASIC that require write and/or read to and from register can be implemented using UTSL. The example below shows a test where a certain trim code is written to a register and based on the trim code the internal regulator steps in voltage which is read back (see the picture2).

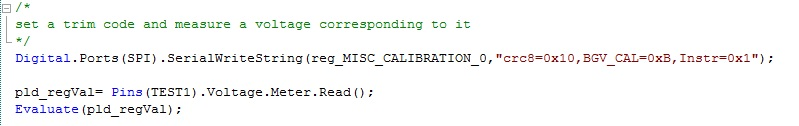
picture2

Additionally, UTSL allows the user to define the state of the instrument i.e. connected to the pin, or disconnected from the pin.
