= Advance 86 =

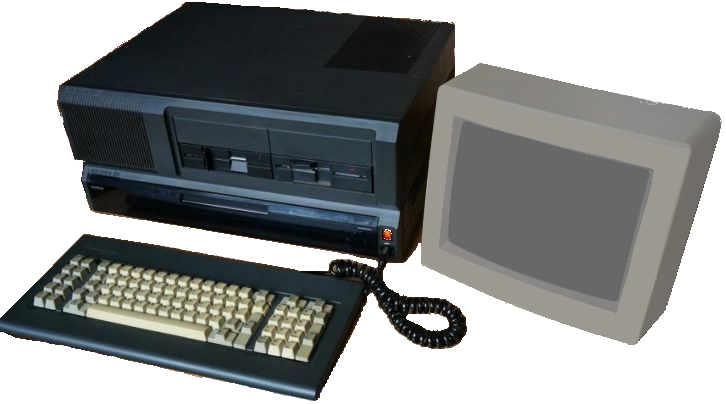
- An Advance 86B system
- Type: Personal computer
- Released: December 1, 1983; 42 years ago
- Operating system: IBM BASIC / MS-DOS
- CPU: Intel 8086 @ 4.77 MHz
- Memory: 128 KB – 768 KB
- Sound: 1-channel PWM

The Advance 86 was a microcomputer developed by Advance Technology UK in the United Kingdom, available in two models. The base model, the Model A (or Advance 86A), featuring a system unit and keyboard, was specified and priced to appeal to the home market, relying on cassette-based storage. An upgraded model, the Model B (or Advance 86B), augmented the Model A with an expansion unit providing dual floppy disk drives and was intended to appeal to business users. Through the addition of the expansion unit, the Model A could therefore be upgraded to the Model B. The core system employed the Intel 8086 processor, aiming for a level of compatibility with the IBM PC, and 128 KB of RAM, expandable to 256 RAM in the system unit and to a total of 768 KB utilising the expansion unit.

== History ==
Both models of the Advance 86 were initially announced in 1983, after a development period of a reported one-and-a-half years, with a launch reportedly scheduled for September 1983. Initial pricing was estimated at £350 excluding VAT for the lower-specification Model A, positioned as a competitor to the BBC Micro and Commodore 64, with a Model B system projected to cost £1,200 excluding VAT, bundled with WordStar, Mailmerge and CalcStar. The Advance 86 eventually became available in 1984, with broadly similar pricing, but was instead offered with the Perfect productivity suite. In addition to the computer itself, a separate display needed to be purchased.

The machine was manufactured by Ferranti, nine of whose ULA chips had been used to minimise the component count on the main system board, and sold "exclusively" through high street retailer WHSmith, at least initially. After initial orders had been satisfied, the system was also to be marketed by Ferranti and sold by dealers. A year of on-site service was included in the price of the Model B, this being regarded as "worth several hundred pounds" and superior to the support for any other contemporary microcomputer with the exception of the DEC Rainbow.

In Australia, Dick Smith Electronics marketed the Advance 86 as the Challenger, pricing the Model A configuration at just under A$1,000, with the complete Model B configuration priced at a total of just under A$3,000.

Ferranti, as manufacturer of the Advance 86, along with WHSmith as distributor, were threatened with legal action by IBM over the machine's BIOS, with the routines allegedly being "90 per cent identical" to IBM's own BIOS, with even known errors "reproduced identically". Ostensibly as a consequence of the legal uncertainties, and with WHSmith also reporting "disappointing" sales, Ferranti announced that it would take over distribution of the machine in early 1985. To continue distribution of the product, Advance Technology were reported to have rewritten the BIOS to IBM's approval.

== Hardware ==
Alongside the 8086 processor, a slot for the 8087 arithmetic co-processor was provided. In addition to the main system RAM, 16 KB of video RAM was provided to hold the contents of the display. This permitted a graphical display with a resolution of 640 x 200 or an 80-column text display in black and white. Alternatively, a graphical display of 320 x 200 or a 40-column display could display four colours from a palette of 16. RGB, television and composite video outputs were provided, but a monitor with a sufficiently high horizontal resolution was recommended for use of the high-resolution display. Picture adjustment was reportedly required to stretch the picture vertically unless the machine was set to produce output at a 50 Hz refresh frequency instead of the recommended 60 Hz. Two joystick ports, a Centronics printer port were available on the Model A, alongside the 5-pin DIN socket for the cassette recorder, with the Model B also adding an RS-232 serial port.

The Model B configuration provided two 360 KB 5.25-inch floppy disk drives, four IBM PC-compatible 8-bit expansion slots, one occupied by the disk controller card, and two proprietary 16-bit slots. Adding the expansion unit to the Model A involved connecting ribbon cables to two connectors accessible via a removable panel on one side of the system unit, with a power connection being routed similarly on the other side of the unit. Combining the two units made the system appear "decidedly overbearing" to some, "big, black and bulky" to others, The Model B was about two-and-a-half times taller than the Model A, with the system unit being 108mm high and the expansion unit adding another 146mm. The casing of the units was black plastic, with the core system unit having room for storing the full size IBM compatible keyboard behind a "hi-fi style smoked perspex door", although ergonomic problems with the door itself were reported.

10 MB hard drive and 384 KB RAM expansions were reportedly promised for the machine, but these were still unavailable by the time the machine was reviewed as the Dick Smith Challenger, with skepticism expressed that the "strange elongated" proprietary 16-bit expansion slots would ever see any available expansions made for them. Reviewers also disapproved of the need to cut away at the plastic case with a sharp knife to fit expansion slots, this risking injury to the user.

== Software ==
The Model A was anticipated to benefit from the availability of software for the "entry level cassette-based version of the IBM PC" that had been sold in the US, and the Model A was provided with the same IBM Cassette BASIC as such early IBM PC models. However, such cassette software availability was perceived as lacking, with buyers likely to demand titles only available on disk. Despite reported efforts by WHSmith to develop cassette-based titles, the Model A remained unavailable as the Model B arrived on retail outlets. Nevertheless, one reviewer, unimpressed with the Model B and the system in general, regarded the Model A as "worth a closer look as a hobbyist machine".

The Model B configuration introduced combinations of PC DOS and GW-BASIC, or MS-DOS and BASICA. Software compatibility with the IBM PC was almost unanimously regarded as impressive. Microsoft Flight Simulator, regarded as "the acid test of any so-called compatible", along with software such as WordStar, Lotus 1-2-3, and numerous other packages, largely worked without error with only occasional exceptions. One of these was the Perfect Link package that complemented the supplied Perfect software suite, with this incompatibility being attributed to a hardware configuration issue. The performance of the system when running software was "significantly faster" than the IBM PC, with this attributed to the faster 8086 processor, having a 16-bit data bus, compared with the IBM PC's 8088 processor with its 8-bit data bus.

== Reception ==
Reviewers were divided on the merits of being able to upgrade a relatively low-cost home computer to a more expensive business model. Some regarded the "clear and logical upgrade path" as superior to machines like the BBC Model B, and assessed the system as living up to the promise of a home computer upgradeable to "full business status". Others regarded the upgrade route as not offering particularly good value for money, noting deficiencies in the build quality and design of the machine. And others noted that while some DOS-based machines, such as the Sanyo MBC-555, were more competitively priced and compatible enough with the IBM PC to be worth considering in preference to the Advance 86, such machines were not necessarily able to demonstrate a comparable level of PC compatibility, nor offer an upgrade path from a cheaper machine.

In Australia, "astute marketing" of the unexpanded Challenger below the "psychological $1000 barrier" made the system worth considering for those "on a tight budget, but still desperately keen to get hold of a minimal 8086 system". However, such a system could hardly be regarded as IBM PC-compatible without disks or expansion slots, and cassette software availability was "extremely limited, if not non-existent". Meanwhile, the Australian market had already started to offer Taiwanese PC compatibles competitive on price and features with the Challenger.
