= Restrictive design rules =

Type of constraints on computer hardware designs

Design rules are maintained and released by a semiconductor foundry for its customers (layout designers of integrated circuits) to follow. Restrictive design rules (RDRs) curtail some of the "freedom" layout designers have traditionally had with regular design rules in less advanced process technologies. To achieve and maintain an acceptable return on investment for its customers and by extension for itself, a foundry may be compelled, for technological reasons, to adopt RDRs to better ensure the completed layout design of an integrated circuit is manufacturable with a desired yield in more advanced process technologies.
