= Design rule checking =

Verification of geometric constraints on electronic designs

In electronic design automation, a design rule is a geometric constraint imposed on circuit board, semiconductor device, and integrated circuit (IC) designers to ensure their designs function properly, reliably, and can be produced with acceptable yield. Design rules for production are developed by process engineers based on the capability of their processes to realize design intent. Electronic design automation is used extensively to ensure that designers do not violate design rules; a process called design rule checking (DRC). DRC is a major step during physical verification signoff on the design, which also involves LVS (layout versus schematic) checks, XOR checks, ERC (electrical rule check), and antenna checks. The importance of design rules and DRC is greatest for ICs, which have micro- or nano-scale geometries; for advanced processes, some fabs also insist upon the use of more restricted rules to improve yield.

== Design rules ==
The basic DRC checks - width, spacing, and enclosure

Design rules are a series of parameters provided by semiconductor manufacturers that enable the designer to verify the correctness of a mask set. Design rules are specific to a particular semiconductor manufacturing process. A design rule set specifies certain geometric and connectivity restrictions to ensure sufficient margins to account for variability in semiconductor manufacturing processes, so as to ensure that most of the parts work correctly.

The most basic design rules are shown in the diagram on the right. The first are single layer rules. A width rule specifies the minimum width of any shape in the design. A spacing rule specifies the minimum distance between two adjacent objects. These rules will exist for each layer of semiconductor manufacturing process, with the lowest layers having the smallest rules (typically 100 nm as of 2007) and the highest metal layers having larger rules (perhaps 400 nm as of 2007).

A two layer rule specifies a relationship that must exist between two layers. For example, an enclosure rule might specify that an object of one type, such as a contact or via, must be covered, with some additional margin, by a metal layer. A typical value as of 2007 might be about 10 nm.

There are many other rule types not illustrated here. A minimum area rule is just what the name implies. Antenna rules are complex rules that check ratios of areas of every layer of a net for configurations that can result in problems when intermediate layers are etched. Many other such rules exist and are explained in detail in the documentation provided by the semiconductor manufacturer.

Academic design rules are often specified in terms of a scalable parameter, λ, so that all geometric tolerances in a design may be defined as integer multiples of λ. This simplifies the migration of existing chip layouts to newer processes. Industrial rules are more highly optimized, and only approximate uniform scaling. Design rule sets have become increasingly more complex with each subsequent generation of semiconductor process.

== Software ==
The main objective of design rule checking (DRC) is to achieve a high overall yield and reliability for the design. If design rules are violated the design may not be functional. To meet this goal of improving die yields, DRC has evolved from simple measurement and Boolean checks, to more involved rules that modify existing features, insert new features, and check the entire design for process limitations such as layer density. A completed layout consists not only of the geometric representation of the design, but also data that provides support for the manufacture of the design. While design rule checks do not validate that the design will operate correctly, they are constructed to verify that the structure meets the process constraints for a given design type and process technology.

DRC software usually takes as input a layout in the GDSII standard format and a list of rules specific to the semiconductor process chosen for fabrication. From these it produces a report of design rule violations that the designer may or may not choose to correct. Carefully "stretching" or waiving certain design rules is often used to increase performance and component density at the expense of yield.

DRC products define rules in a language to describe the operations needed to be performed in DRC. For example, Mentor Graphics uses Standard Verification Rule Format (SVRF) language in their DRC rules files and Magma Design Automation is using Tcl-based language. A set of rules for a particular process is referred to as a run-set, rule deck, or just a deck.

DRC is a very computationally intensive task. Usually DRC checks will be run on each sub-section of the ASIC to minimize the number of errors that are detected at the top level. If run on a single CPU, customers may have to wait up to a week to get the result of a Design Rule check for modern designs. Most design companies require DRC to run in less than a day to achieve reasonable cycle times since the DRC will likely be run several times prior to design completion. With today's processing power, full-chip DRCs may run in much shorter times as quick as one hour depending on the chip complexity and size.

Some categories of design rules (checked by DRC) in IC design include:

- Active to active spacing
- Well to well spacing
- Minimum channel length of the transistor
- Minimum metal width
- Metal to metal spacing
- Metal fill density (for processes using CMP)
- Poly density
- ESD and I/O rules
- Antenna effect

=== Commercial ===
Major products in the DRC area of EDA include:

- Altium Designer
- Advanced Design System Desktop DRC by PathWave Design (Keysight Technologies Previously Agilent's EEsof EDA division)
- Calibre by Mentor Graphics
- Diva, DRACULA, Assura, PVS and Pegasus by Cadence Design Systems
- Hercules and IC Validator by Synopsys
- Guardian by Silvaco
- HyperLynx DRC Free/Gold by Mentor Graphics
- PowerDRC -now SmartDRC by Silvaco
- SmartDRC by Silvaco
- Quartz by Magma Design Automation

=== Free software ===
- Electric VLSI Design System
- KLayout
- Magic
- Alliance -- A Free VLSI/CAD System
- Opencircuitdesign software:
- Microwind -- An educational layout CAD system
- Opensource 130nm CMOS PDK by Google and SkyWater tech. Foundry
