= AEi Systems =

Engineering Company

- Industry: Aerospace industry Defence industry
- Products: Electronics

AEi Systems is a space and power electronics engineering firm based in the United States that concentrates on circuit, systems and design analysis.

AEi Systems specialises in Worst case circuit analysis (WCCA) of critical space-bound circuitry, boards and components, including power supplies and power systems. Such specialized analysis often informs changes and updates to designs that have previously been deemed flight-ready.

The company is well known for its deep analysis of space-bound DC-DC converters and other industrial and commercial power supplies and power systems — especially those that must operate reliably over long periods of time (often under extreme conditions that include combinations of radiation, magnetic fields, heat, cold, and the like). Analyses often performed by AEi Systems include stress analysis, failure analysis, and reliability analysis, in addition to WCCA .

AEi Systems also has significant digital analysis offerings and capabilities in signal integrity, power integrity, and Worst Case Digital Analysis.

AEi Systems engineers are recognized by Aerospace Corporation as WCCA Subject Matter Experts. AEi Systems WCCA Subject Matter Experts worked with Aerospace Corporation to draft and set the current standards for WCCA of high reliability (or "hi-rel") circuitry.

== History ==
The company's predecessor, Analytical Engineering, Inc., was founded in 1995. The company met with significant early success as the developer of simulation models and performed Worst Case Circuit Analysis on the International Space Station's power bus electronics. A series of satellite projects continued to keep founder Steve Sandler and Analytical Engineering busy, including Tempo, Globalstar, GOES, GPS, MCI, Omegasat and P-81.

In 2002, with the idea of expanding the business and the management team, the businesses of Arizona-based Analytical Engineering, Inc. and a related New York-based company, Analytical Services, Inc., were combined and purchased by AEi Systems, LLC in transactions spearheaded by Charles Hymowitz (an electrical engineer formerly of McDonnell Douglas and Intusoft) and his business partner, Lee Weinberg.

AEi Systems continues to improve its capabilities and to set the standard for performance of Worst Case Circuit Analysis, stress analysis, failure analysis and reliability analysis. AEi Systems has also expanded its digital analysis offerings and capabilities to include performance of in-depth reviews and analyses of the signal integrity and the power integrity of identified circuitry, boards and systems (in addition to Worst Case Digital Analysis).

AEi Systems has senior engineers in several United States cities.

== AEi Systems: Overview, Achievements and Projects ==
=== Divisions/Organization ===
The company has three, inter-related business lines:

- Analysis: Worst Case Circuit Analysis (WCCA), failure and reliability analyses; signal integrity, power integrity and other digital analyses.
- SPICE Modeling: Modeling of complex integrated circuits for major IC manufacturers and to support AEi Systems' analysis efforts and reporting.
- Software: Sale of licensed copies of the company's (i) Power IC Model Library for PSpice, and (ii) WCCA templates and tables.

=== Noteworthy achievements and facts ===
- Motorola University's "six sigma class" on worst-case analysis was created by AEi Systems.
- AEi Systems performed important work on the LVPS power supply for the Atlas Experiment at the Large Hadron Collider (LHC) at CERN (the world's largest and most powerful particle accelerator; the Atlas Experiment revealed/confirmed the existence of the previously theoretical Higgs Boson).
- AEi Systems performed important analyses on the mission-critical Rubidium Frequency Standard (RFS) atomic clock and other components of the U.S. Air Force's Global Positioning System GPS IIF and GPS III.
- Most SPICE models for rad-hard Power ICs available on the Internet (or held in confidence) were created by AEi Systems, including those found on the websites of ON Semiconductor and Texas Instruments and those used via National Semiconductor's (now Texas Instruments') online WEBENCH tool.
- AEi Systems analyzed the power bus for the International Space Station.
- Many of the circuits and components analyzed by AEi Systems must keep within pre-set size and weight limitations and meet difficult "hi-rel" performance requirements at all times (notwithstanding harsh and varied operating environments).

=== Defense and Aerospace Projects ===
AEi Systems has been involved in the development and analysis of power systems in space and military defense, commercial applications, and industrial applications. The company provides (or uses its proprietary) computer simulation models and performs WCCA on most projects.

Many of the company's projects are for United States "classified" programs. Among the company's publicly known projects are:

- BSAT
- CMIS
- Globalstar
- GMI
- GOES
- GPS (incl. GPS IIF and GPS III)
- HS-702
- Intellsat
- Juno
- MCI
- Milstar
- MSV
- MUOS
- NPOESS
- Omegasat
- P1196
- P-81
- SMMA
- SMU
- Spaceway
- Tempo
- Virgo
- XPC

=== Commercial and Scientific Projects ===
AEi Systems has also been active in commercial and industrial projects that do not involve space, military or defense. For example, AEi Systems has worked on:

- Darwin, a 100 kW Remotely Operated underwater Vehicle (ROV) that operates underneath the North Sea under 17 kPSI at over 6 kM
- The Atlas Experiment at the Large Hadron Collider (LHC) at CERN, the world's largest and most powerful particle accelerator that revealed the Higgs Boson.
- Projects for DeLL and EMC.
- Projects involving international security systems.
- Time-sensitive projects involving nuclear power plants.

=== SPICE Modeling ===
AEi Systems has produced robust SPICE models for many major IC manufacturers, including Texas Instruments, ON Semiconductor, Analog Devices, Linear Technology and National Semiconductor.

Since 2005, AEi Systems' modeling business unit has produced and internationally distributed its 600-model Power IC Model Library for PSpice.

The company has also developed a library of proprietary SPICE models (including models of space-qualified rad-hardened ICs) to support its performance WCCA services and reporting.

=== WCCA Training and Support ===
The company developed and taught the "six sigma" WCCA training class for Motorola University, and continues to teach WCCA techniques via on-line and on-site classes for customers.
