= Joungho Kim =

South Korean engineer

Joungho Kim (born 1961) is an electrical engineer with the Korea Advanced Institute of Science and Technology (KAIST) in Daejeon, South Korea. Kim was named a Fellow of the Institute of Electrical and Electronics Engineers (IEEE) in 2016 for his contributions to modeling signal and power integrity in 3D integrated circuits.
