= Charge sharing =

Charge sharing is an effect of signal degradation through transfer of charges from one electronic domain to another.

== Charge sharing in semiconductor radiation detectors ==
In pixelated semiconductor radiation detectors - such as photon-counting or hybrid-pixel detectors, charge sharing refers to the diffusion of electrical charges with a negative impact on image quality.

=== Formation of charge sharing ===
In the active detector layer of photon detectors, incident photons are converted to electron-hole pairs via the photoelectric effect. The resulting charge cloud is being accelerated towards the readout electronics via an applied voltage bias. Because of thermic energy and repulsion due to the electric fields inside such a device, the charge cloud diffuses, effectively getting larger in lateral size. In pixelated detectors, this effect can lead to a detection of parts of the initial charge cloud in neighbouring pixels. As the probability for this cross talk increases towards pixel edges, it is more prominent in detectors with smaller pixel size. Furthermore, fluorescence of the detector material above its K-edge can lead to additional charge carriers that add to the effect of charge-sharing. Especially in photon counting detectors, charge sharing can lead to errors in the signal count.

=== Problems of charge sharing ===
Especially in photon counting detectors, the energy of an incident photon is correlated with the net sum of the charge in the primary charge cloud. This kind of detectors often use thresholds to be able to act over a certain noise level but also to discriminate incident photons of different energies. If a certain part of the charge cloud is diffusing to the read-out electronics of a neighbouring pixel, this results in the detection of two events with lower energy than the primary photon. Furthermore, if the resulting charge in one of the affected pixels is smaller than the threshold, the event is discarded as noise. In general, this leads to the underestimation of the energy of incident photons. The registration of one incident photon in several pixels degrades spatial resolution, as the information about the primary interaction is smeared out. Furthermore, this effect leads to degradation of energy resolution due to the general underestimation. Especially in medical applications, charge sharing reduces the dose efficiency, meaning that the useful proportion of the incident dose for imaging applications is reduced.

=== Correction of charge sharing ===
There are several approaches on the correction of charge sharing. One approach is to neglect all events, where in the same time window there is a detector response in more than one corresponding pixel - which severely reduces detector efficiency and limits the possible maximum countrate. Another approach is addition of the low levels of signal of correlated events in neighbouring pixels and attribution to the pixel with the largest signal. Other correction approaches basically rely on a deconvolution in the signal domain, taking calibrated detector response into account.

== Charge sharing in digital electronics ==
In digital electronics, charge sharing is an undesirable signal integrity phenomenon observed most commonly in the domino logic family of digital circuits. The charge sharing problem occurs when the charge which is stored at the output node in the precharge phase is shared among the output or junction capacitances of transistors which are in the evaluation phase. Charge sharing may degrade the output voltage level or even cause erroneous output value
