= Unger model =

Crosstalk in communication systems

The Unger Model is an empirical standard model for near-end crosstalk (NEXT) power spectra as experienced by communication systems over unshielded twisted pair (UTP).

Twisted pair cables are usually grouped together in a binder where they experience crosstalk. Based on empirical observations, Unger proposed that, at the 1% worst case, the NEXT power spectra $|H_\mathrm{NEXT}(f)|^2$, due to a single disturber, can be bounded by

$$10\log(|H_\mathrm{NEXT}(f)|^2)=\begin{cases} -66 + 6\log(f)\,\text{dB}, & \text{if } f < 20\,\text{kHz}; \\ -50.5 + 15\log(f)\,\text{dB}, & \text{if } f \geq 20\,\text{kHz}. \end{cases}$$
while the NEXT power spectra due to 49 disturbers (full binder) can be bounded by

$$10\log(|H_\mathrm{NEXT}(f)|^2)=\begin{cases} -59.2 + 4\log(f)\,\text{dB}, & \text{if } f < 20\,\text{kHz}; \\ -42.2 + 14\log(f)\,\text{dB}, & \text{if } f \geq 20\,\text{kHz}. \end{cases}$$

== See also ==
- Digital subscriber line
