= Attenuation-to-crosstalk ratio =

Measurement that represents the overall performance of a cable

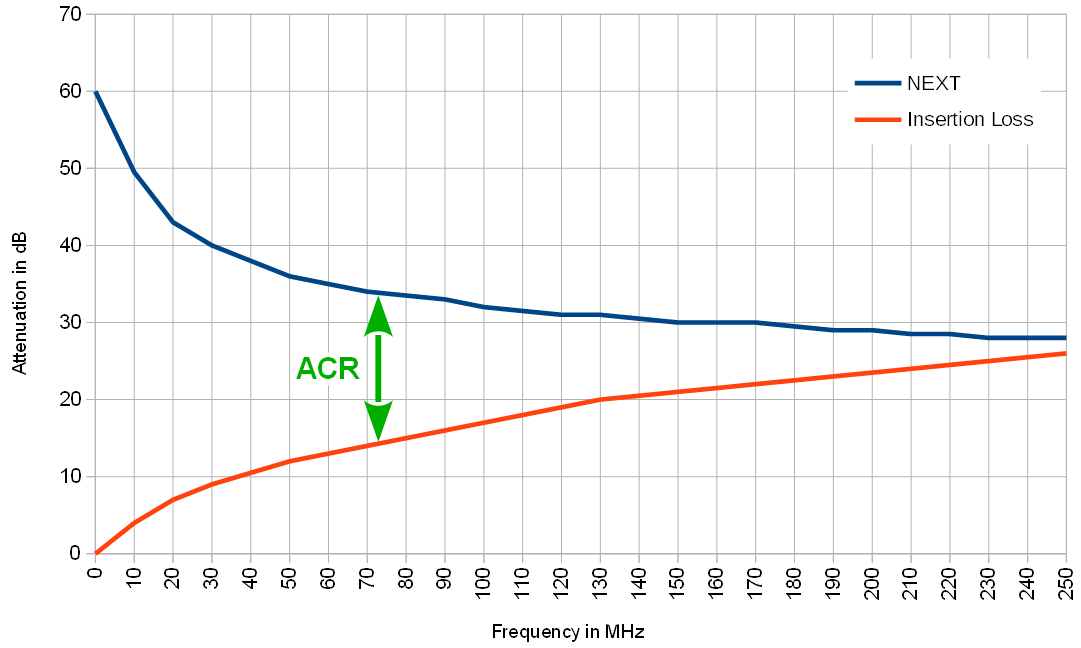

Attenuation-to-crosstalk ratio (ACR) is a parameter that is measured when testing a communication link, which represents the overall performance of the cable. AcR is a mathematical formula that calculates the ratio of attenuation to near-end crosstalk for each combination of cable pairs. ACR is expressed as a figure in decibels (dB), between the signal attenuation produced by a wire or cable transmission medium and the near-end crosstalk (NEXT). In order for a signal to be received with an acceptable bit error rate, the attenuation and the crosstalk must both be minimized. Crosstalk can be reduced by ensuring that twisted-pair wiring is tightly twisted and is not crushed, and by ensuring that connectors between wire and cable media are properly rated and installed.

Positive ACR calculations mean that transmitted signal strength is stronger than that of near-end crosstalk. ACR can be used to define a signal bandwidth (e.g. 250 MHz for category 6 cable) where signal to noise ratios are sufficient to support certain applications. The maximum frequency for which positive ACR is assured provides a benchmark to assess the usable bandwidth of twisted-pair cabling systems. EIA/TIA specifies specific values for ACR in order to meet the various categories of cable.
