= Steven Sandler =

American inventor and businessman

Steven M. Sandler is an American inventor and founder of Picotest.

In 2023, Sandler received the DesignCon Engineer of the Year award.

== Selected works ==
- Switch-Mode Power Supply Simulation: Designing with SPICE 3 (2005)
- Switched-Mode Power Supply Simulation with SPICE (2018)
- Power Integrity: Measuring, Optimizing, and Troubleshooting Power Related Parameters in Electronics Systems (2014)
- Power Integrity Using ADS (2019)
