= Substrate coupling =

In an integrated circuit, a signal can couple from one node to another via the substrate. This phenomenon is referred to as substrate coupling or substrate noise coupling.

The push for reduced cost, more compact circuit boards, and added customer features has provided incentives for the inclusion of analog functions on primarily digital MOS integrated circuits (ICs) forming mixed-signal ICs. In these systems, the speed of digital circuits is constantly increasing, chips are becoming more densely packed, interconnect layers are added, and analog resolution is increased. In addition, recent increase in wireless applications and its growing market are introducing a new set of aggressive design goals for realizing mixed-signal systems. Here, the designer integrates radio frequency (RF) analog and base band digital circuitry on a single chip. The goal is to make single-chip radio frequency integrated circuits (RFICs) on silicon, where all the blocks are fabricated on the same chip. One of the advantages of this integration is low power dissipation for portability due to a reduction in the number of package pins and associated bond wire capacitance. Another reason that an integrated solution offers lower power consumption is that routing high-frequency signals off-chip often requires a 50Ω impedance match, which can result in higher power dissipation. Other advantages include improved high-frequency performance due to reduced package interconnect parasitics, higher system reliability, smaller package count, and higher integration of RF components with VLSI-compatible digital circuits. In fact, the single-chip transceiver is now a reality.

The design of such systems, however, is a complicated task. There are two main challenges in realizing mixed-signal ICs. The first challenging task, specific to RFICs, is to fabricate good on-chip passive elements such as high-Q inductors. The second challenging task, applicable to any mixed-signal IC and the subject of this chapter, is to minimize noise coupling between various parts of the system to avoid any malfunctioning of the system. In other words, for successful system-on-chip integration of mixed-signal systems, the noise coupling caused by nonideal isolation must be minimized so that sensitive analog circuits and noisy digital circuits can effectively coexist, and the system operates correctly. To elaborate, note that in mixed-signal circuits, both sensitive analog circuits and high-swing high-frequency noise injector digital circuits may be present on the same chip, leading to undesired signal coupling between these two types of circuit via the conductive substrate. The reduced distance between these circuits, which is the result of constant technology scaling (see Moore's law and the International Technology Roadmap for Semiconductors), exacerbates the coupling. The problem is severe, since signals of different nature and strength interfere, thus affecting the overall performance, which demands higher clock rates and greater analog precisions.

The primary mixed-signal noise coupling problem comes from fast-changing digital signals coupling to sensitive analog nodes. Another significant cause of undesired signal coupling is the crosstalk between analog nodes themselves owing to high-frequency/high-power analog signals. One of the media through which mixed-signal noise coupling occurs is the substrate. Digital operations cause fluctuations in the underlying substrate voltage, which spreads through the common substrate causing variations in the substrate potential of sensitive devices in the analog section. Similarly, in the case of crosstalk between analog nodes, a signal can couple from one node to another via the substrate. This phenomenon is referred to as substrate coupling or substrate noise coupling.

== Modelling, analysis, and verification of mixed signal coupling ==
There is a sizeable literature on substrate, and mixed signal coupling. Some of the most common topics are:

- Differentiating between the random noise inherent to electronic devices and the deterministic noise generated by circuits.
- Examining the physical phenomena responsible for the creation of undesired signals in a digital circuit and the mechanisms of their transport to other parts of the system. The substrate is the most common coupling mechanism, but capacitive coupling, mutual inductance, and coupling through power supplies are also analyzed.
- Comparing various modeling approaches and simulation techniques. There are many possible models for digital noise generation, the substrate impedance network, and the sensitivity of the (unintended) receiver. The chosen techniques significantly influence the speed and accuracy of the analysis.
- Substrate and mixed-signal analysis techniques can be applied to placement and power distribution synthesis.

== Further reading / External links ==
- Technical Book: "Noise Coupling in Integrated Circuits: A Practical Approach to Analysis, Modeling, and Suppression", by Cosmin Iorga, Ph.D., 286pages, Hardcover
