= Signal integrity =

Concept in digital electronics

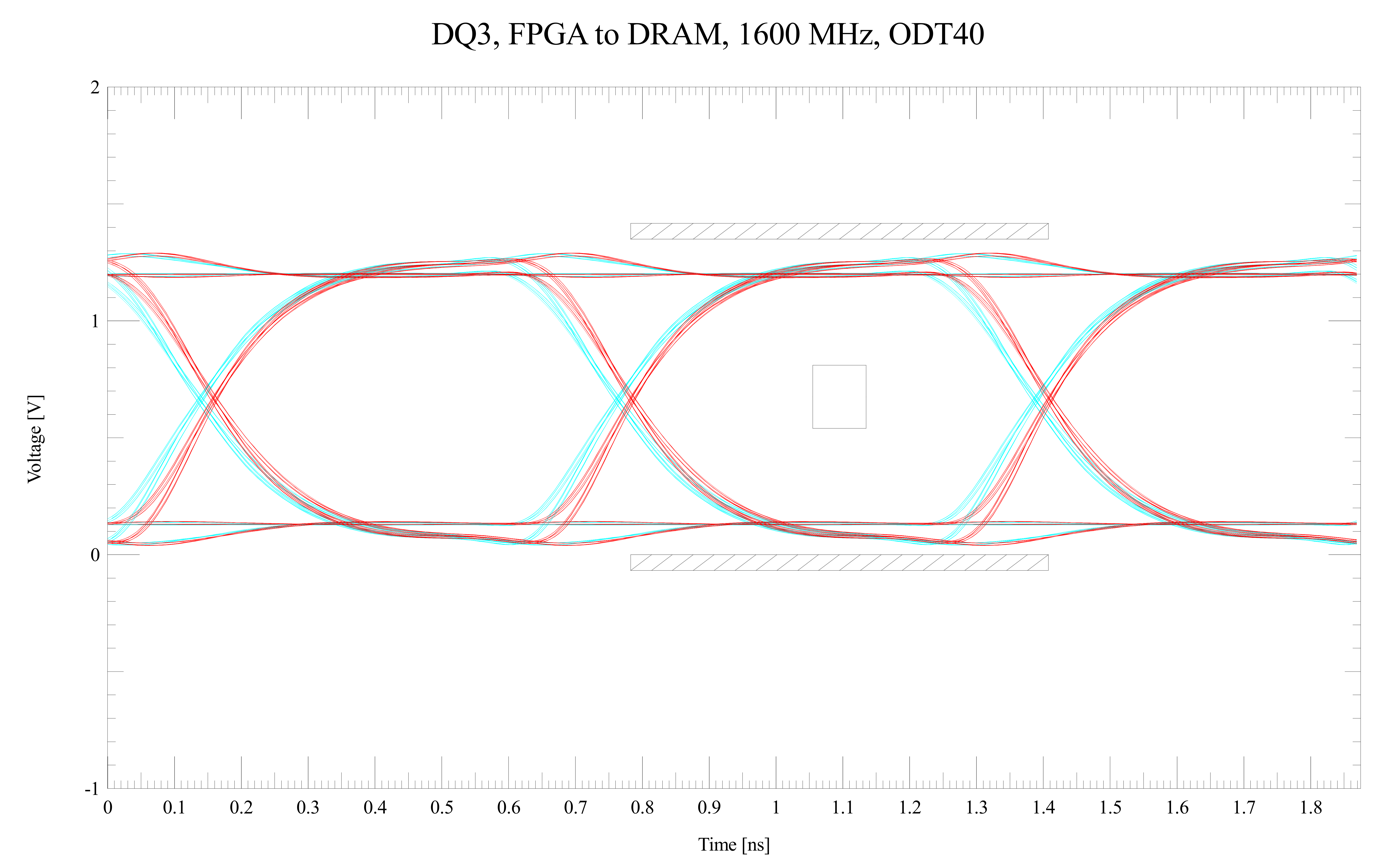
Simulated eye diagram displaying a DDR3 signal waveform

Signal integrity or SI is a set of measures of the quality of an electrical signal. In digital electronics, a stream of binary values is represented by a voltage (or current) waveform. However, digital signals are fundamentally analog in nature, and all signals are subject to effects such as noise, distortion, and loss. Over short distances and at low bit rates, a simple conductor can transmit this with sufficient fidelity. At high bit rates and over longer distances or through various mediums, various effects can degrade the electrical signal to the point where errors occur and the system or device fails. Signal integrity engineering is the task of analyzing and mitigating these effects. It is an important activity at all levels of electronics packaging and assembly, from internal connections of an integrated circuit (IC), through the package, the printed circuit board (PCB), the backplane, and inter-system connections. While there are some common themes at these various levels, there are also practical considerations, in particular the interconnect flight time versus the bit period, that cause substantial differences in the approach to signal integrity for on-chip connections versus chip-to-chip connections.

Some of the main issues of concern for signal integrity are ringing, crosstalk, ground bounce, distortion, signal loss, and power supply noise.

== History ==
Signal integrity primarily involves the electrical performance of the wires and other packaging structures used to move signals about within an electronic product. Such performance is a matter of basic physics and as such has remained relatively unchanged since the inception of electronic signaling. The first transatlantic telegraph cable suffered from severe signal integrity problems, and analysis of the problems yielded many of the mathematical tools still used today to analyze signal integrity problems, such as the telegrapher's equations. Products as old as the Western Electric crossbar telephone exchange (circa 1940), based on the wire-spring relay, suffered almost all the effects seen today - the ringing, crosstalk, ground bounce, and power supply noise that plague modern digital products.

On printed circuit boards, signal integrity became a serious concern when the transition (rise and fall) times of signals started to become comparable to the propagation time across the board. Very roughly speaking, this typically happens when system speeds exceed a few tens of MHz. At first, only a few of the most important, or highest speed, signals needed detailed analysis or design. As speeds increased, a larger and larger fraction of signals needed SI analysis and design practices. In modern (> 100 MHz) circuit designs, essentially all signals must be designed with SI in mind.

For ICs, SI analysis became necessary as an effect of reduced design rules. In the early days of the modern VLSI era, digital chip circuit design and layout were manual processes. The use of abstraction and the application of automatic synthesis techniques have since allowed designers to express their designs using high-level languages and apply an automated design process to create very complex designs, ignoring the electrical characteristics of the underlying circuits to a large degree. However, scaling trends (see Moore's law) brought electrical effects back to the forefront in recent technology nodes. With scaling of technology below 0.25 μm, the wire delays have become comparable or even greater than the gate delays. As a result, the wire delays needed to be considered to achieve timing closure. In nanometer technologies at 0.13 μm and below, unintended interactions between signals (e.g. crosstalk) became an important consideration for digital design. At these technology nodes, the performance and correctness of a design cannot be assured without considering noise effects.

Most of this article is about SI in relation to modern electronic technology - notably the use integrated circuits and printed circuit board technology. Nevertheless, the principles of SI are not exclusive to the signalling technology used. SI existed long before the advent of either technology, and will do so as long as electronic communications persist.

== On-chip signal integrity ==
Signal integrity problems in modern integrated circuits (ICs) can have many drastic consequences for digital designs:

- Products can fail to operate at all, or worse yet, become unreliable in the field.
- The design may work, but only at speeds slower than planned
- Yield may be lowered, sometimes drastically

The cost of these failures is very high, and includes photomask costs, engineering costs and opportunity cost due to delayed product introduction. Therefore, electronic design automation (EDA) tools have been developed to analyze, prevent, and correct these problems. In integrated circuits, or ICs, the main cause of signal integrity problems is crosstalk. In CMOS technologies, this is primarily due to coupling capacitance, but in general it may be caused by mutual inductance, substrate coupling, non-ideal gate operation, and other sources. The fixes normally involve changing the sizes of drivers and/or spacing of wires.

In analog circuits, designers are also concerned with noise that arise from physical sources, such as thermal noise, flicker noise, and shot noise. These noise sources on the one hand present a lower limit to the smallest signal that can be amplified, and on the other, define an upper limit to the useful amplification.

In digital ICs, noise in a signal of interest arises primarily from coupling effects from switching of other signals. Increasing interconnect density has led to each wire having neighbors that are physically closer together, leading to increased crosstalk between neighboring nets. As circuits have continued to shrink in accordance with Moore's law, several effects have conspired to make noise problems worse:

- To keep resistance tolerable despite decreased width, modern wire geometries are thicker in proportion to their spacing. This increases the sidewall capacitance at the expense of capacitance to ground, hence increasing the induced noise voltage (expressed as a fraction of supply voltage).
- Technology scaling has led to lower threshold voltages for MOS transistors, and has also reduced the difference between threshold and supply voltages, thereby reducing noise margins.
- Logic speeds, and clock speeds in particular, have increased significantly, thus leading to faster transition (rise and fall) times. These faster transition times are closely linked to higher capacitive crosstalk. Also, at such high speeds the inductive properties of the wires come into play, especially mutual inductance.

These effects have increased the interactions between signals and decreased the noise immunity of digital CMOS circuits. This has led to noise being a significant problem for digital ICs that must be considered by every digital chip designer prior to tape-out. There are several concerns that must be mitigated:

- Noise may cause a signal to assume the wrong value. This is particularly critical when the signal is about to be latched (or sampled), for a wrong value could be loaded into a storage element, causing logic failure.
- Noise may delay the settling of the signal to the correct value. This is often called noise-on-delay.
- Noise (e.g. ringing) may cause the input voltage of a gate to drop below ground level, or to exceed the supply voltage. This can reduce the lifetime of the device by stressing components, induce latchup, or cause multiple cycling of signals that should only cycle once in a given period.

=== Finding IC signal integrity problems ===
Typically, an IC designer would take the following steps for SI verification:

- Perform a layout extraction to get the parasitics associated with the layout. Usually worst-case parasitics and best-case parasitics are extracted and used in the simulations. For ICs, unlike PCBs, physical measurement of the parasitics is almost never done, since in-situ measurements with external equipment are extremely difficult. Furthermore, any measurement would occur after the chip has been created, which is too late to fix any problems observed.
- Create a list of expected noise events, including different types of noise, such as coupling and charge sharing.
- Create a model for each noise event. It is critical that the model is as accurate as necessary to model the given noise event.
- For each signal event, decide how to excite the circuit so that the noise event will occur.
- Create a SPICE (or another circuit simulator) netlist that represents the desired excitation, to include as many effects (such as parasitic inductance and capacitance, and various distortion effects) as necessary.
- Run SPICE simulations. Analyze the simulation results and decide whether any re-design is required. It is common to analyze the results with an eye pattern and by calculating a timing budget.

Modern signal integrity tools for IC design perform all these steps automatically, producing reports that give a design a clean bill of health, or a list of problems that must be fixed. However, such tools generally are not applied across an entire IC, but only selected signals of interest.

=== Fixing IC signal integrity problems ===
Once a problem is found, it must be fixed. Typical fixes for IC on-chip problems include:

- Removing impedance discontinuities. Finding places where significant shifts in the impedance exist and adjusting the geometry of the path to shift the impedance to better match the rest of the path.
- Driver optimization. You can have too much drive, and also not enough.
- Buffer insertion. In this approach, instead of upsizing the victim driver, a buffer is inserted at an appropriate point in the victim net.
- Aggressor downsizing. This works by increasing the transition time of the attacking net by reducing the strength of its driver.
- Add shielding. Add shielding of critical nets or clock nets using GND and VDD shields to reduce the effect of crosstalk (this technique may lead to routing overhead).
- Routing changes. Routing changes can be very effective in fixing noise problems, mainly by reducing the most troublesome coupling effects via separation.

Each of these fixes may possibly cause other problems. This type of issue must be addressed as part of design flows and design closure. Re-analysis after design changes is a prudent measure.

== On-die termination ==
On-die termination (ODT) or Digitally Controlled Impedance (DCI) is the technology where the termination resistor for impedance matching in transmission lines is located within a semiconductor chip, instead of a separate, discrete device mounted on a circuit board. The proximity of the termination to the receiver shortens the stub between the two, thus improving the overall signal integrity.

== Chip-to-chip signal integrity ==
Reflections occurring as a consequence of termination mismatch. the pulse has a 100 ps rise time. Simulated using Quite Universal Circuit Simulator (Qucs). See Time-domain reflectometry.

For wired connections, it is important to compare the interconnect flight time to the bit period to decide whether an impedance matched or unmatched connection is needed.

The channel flight time (delay) of the interconnect is roughly 1 ns per 15 cm (6 in) of FR-4 stripline (the propagation velocity depends on the dielectric and the geometry). Reflections of previous pulses at impedance mismatches die down after a few bounces up and down the line (i.e. on the order of the flight time). At low bit rates, the echoes die down on their own, and by midpulse, they are not a concern. Impedance matching is neither necessary nor desirable. There are many circuit board types other than FR-4, but usually they are more costly to manufacture.

The gentle trend to higher bit rates accelerated dramatically in 2004, with the introduction by Intel of the PCI-Express standard. Following this lead, the majority of chip-to-chip connection standards underwent an architectural shift from parallel buses to serializer/deserializer (SERDES) links called "lanes". Such serial links eliminate parallel bus clock skew and reduce the number of traces and resultant coupling effects but these advantages come at the cost of a large increase in bit rate on the lanes, and shorter bit periods.

At multigigabit/s data rates, link designers must consider reflections at impedance changes (e.g. where traces change levels at vias, see Transmission lines), noise induced by densely packed neighboring connections (crosstalk), and high-frequency attenuation caused by the skin effect in the metal trace and dielectric loss tangent. Examples of mitigation techniques for these impairments are a redesign of the via geometry to ensure an impedance match, use of differential signaling, and preemphasis filtering, respectively.

At these new multigigabit/s bit rates, the bit period is shorter than the flight time; echoes of previous pulses can arrive at the receiver on top of the main pulse and corrupt it. In communication engineering this is called intersymbol interference (ISI). In signal integrity engineering it is usually called eye closure (a reference to the clutter in the center of a type of oscilloscope trace called an eye diagram). When the bit period is shorter than the flight time, elimination of reflections using classic microwave techniques like matching the electrical impedance of the transmitter to the interconnect, the sections of interconnect to each other, and the interconnect to the receiver, is crucial. Termination with a source or load is a synonym for matching at the two ends. The interconnect impedance that can be selected is constrained by the impedance of free space (~377 Ω), a geometric form factor and by the square root of the relative dielectric constant of the stripline filler (typically FR-4, with a relative dielectric constant of ~4). Together, these properties determine the trace's characteristic impedance. 50 Ω is a convenient choice for single-end lines, and 100 ohm for differential.

As a consequence of the low impedance required by matching, PCB signal traces carry much more current than their on-chip counterparts. This larger current induces crosstalk primarily in a magnetic or inductive mode as opposed to a capacitive mode. To combat this crosstalk, digital PCB designers must remain acutely aware of not only the intended signal path for every signal, but also the path of returning signal current for every signal. The signal itself and its returning signal current path are equally capable of generating inductive crosstalk. Differential trace pairs help to reduce these effects.

A third difference between on-chip and chip-to-chip connection involves the cross-sectional size of the signal conductor, namely that PCB conductors are much larger (typically 100 μm or more in width). Thus, PCB traces have a small series resistance (typically 0.1 Ω/cm) at DC. The high frequency component of the pulse is however attenuated by additional resistance due to the skin effect and dielectric loss tangent associated with the PCB material.

The main challenge often depends on whether the project is a cost-driven consumer application or a performance-driven infrastructure application. They tend to require extensive post-layout verification (using an EM simulator) and pre-layout design optimization (using SPICE and a channel simulator), respectively.

=== Routing topology ===
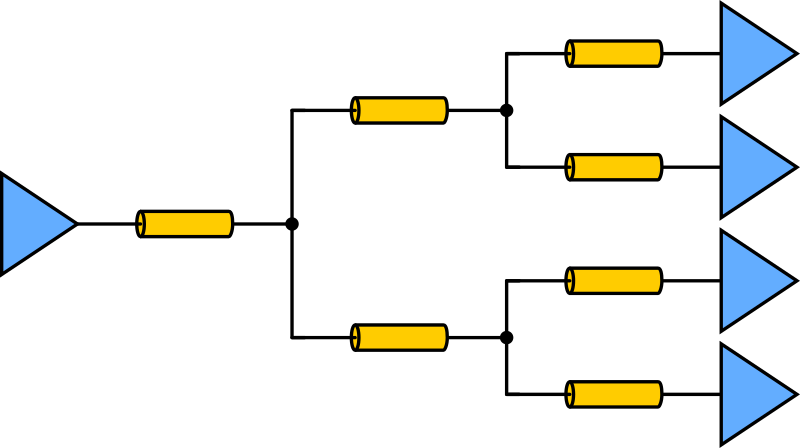
Tree topology similar to that of the DDR2 Command/Address (CA) bank

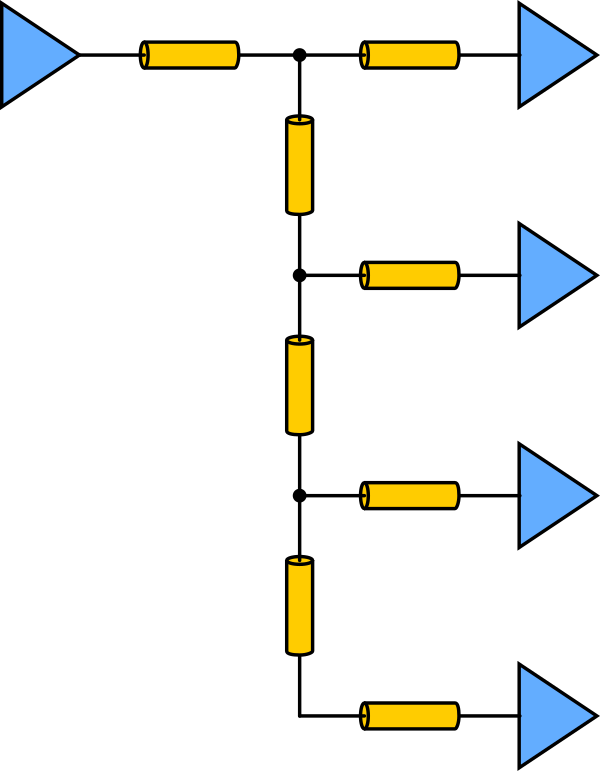
Fly-by topology similar to that of the DDR3 Command/Address (CA) bank

The noise levels on a trace/network is highly dependent on the routing topology selected. In a point-to-point topology, the signal is routed from the transmitter directly to the receiver (this is applied in PCIe, RapidIO, Gigabit Ethernet, DDR2/DDR3/DDR4 DQ/DQS etc.). A point-to-point topology has the least SI-problems since there is no large impedance matches being introduced by line T's (a two-way split of a trace).

For interfaces where multiple packages are receiving from the same line, (for example with a backplane configuration), the line must be split at some point to service all receivers. Some stubs and impedance mismatches are deemed to occur. Multipackage interfaces include BLVDS, DDR2/DDR3/DDR4 C/A bank, RS485 and CAN Bus. There are two main multipackage topologies: Tree and fly-by.

=== Finding signal integrity problems ===
- Perform a layout extraction to get the parasitics associated with the layout. Usually worst-case parasitics and best-case parasitics are extracted and used in the simulations. Because of the distributed nature of many of the impairments, electromagnetic simulation is used for extraction.
- If the PCB or package already exists, the designer can also measure the impairment presented by the connection using high speed instrumentation such as a vector network analyzer. For example, IEEE P802.3ap Task Force uses measured S-parameters as test cases for proposed solutions to the problem of 10 Gbit/s Ethernet over backplanes.
- Accurate noise modeling is a must. Create a list of expected noise events, including different types of noise, such as coupling and charge sharing. Input Output Buffer Information Specification (IBIS) or circuit models may be used to represent drivers and receivers.
- For each noise event, decide how to excite the circuit so that the noise event will occur.
- Create a SPICE (or another circuit simulator) netlist that represents the desired excitation.
- Run SPICE and record the results.
- Analyze the simulation results and decide whether any re-design is required. To analyze the results quite often a data eye is generated and a timing budget is calculated. An example video for generating a data eye can be found on YouTube: An Eye is Born.

There are special purpose EDA tools that help the engineer perform all these steps on each signal in a design, pointing out problems or verifying the design is ready for manufacture. In selecting which tool is best for a particular task, one must consider characteristics of each such as capacity (how many nodes or elements), performance (simulation speed), accuracy (how good are the models), convergence (how good is the solver), capability (non-linear versus linear, frequency dependent versus frequency independent etc.), and ease of use.

== Signal Integrity in PCB Design ==
Signal Integrity (SI) in PCB design refers to the quality of electrical signals as they travel through traces, vias, and components on a printed circuit board. Ensuring good signal integrity is critical for high-speed and high-frequency designs, as poor signal quality can lead to data errors, signal distortion, and system malfunction.

=== Key Factors Affecting Signal Integrity ===
- Reflection
- Crosstalk
- Transmission Line Effects
- Impedance Mismatch
- Electromagnetic Interference (EMI)
- Power Integrity (PI)
- Rise and Fall Time

=== Fixing signal integrity problems ===
An IC package or PCB designer removes signal integrity problems through these techniques:

- Placing a solid reference plane adjacent to the signal traces to control crosstalk
- Controlling the trace width spacing to the reference plane to create consistent trace impedance
- Using terminations to control ringing
- Route traces perpendicular on adjacent layers to reduce crosstalk
- Increasing spacing between traces to reduce crosstalk
- Providing sufficient ground (and power) connections to limit ground bounce (this sub-discipline of signal integrity is sometimes called out separately as power integrity)
- Distributing power with solid plane layers to limit power supply noise
- Adding a pre-emphasis filter to the transmitter driving cell
- Adding an equalizer to the receiving cell
- Improved clock and data recovery (CDR) circuitry with low jitter/phase noise

Each of these fixes may possibly cause other problems. This type of issue must be addressed as part of design flows and design closure.

== See also ==
- Power integrity
- Electromagnetic interference
- Electromagnetic compatibility
