= List of mergers and acquisitions by Intel =

Logo of Intel since 2020

Intel Corporation, an American multinational corporation and technology company headquartered in Santa Clara, California, is the world's largest semiconductor chip manufacturer by revenue. Since its inception, the company has acquired dozens of companies across the global technology industry, with seven multi-billion-dollar acquisitions as of January 2023. Between 1999 and 2003, the company went on an acquisition spree of mostly telecommunications- and networking-related companies, spending $11 billion in the process. Many subsidiaries created in the process—by some estimations, nearly 40—folded or were spun-off at a loss before Intel consolidated the majority of them into the Intel Communication Group and Intel Wireless Communications and Computing Group in 2003. In the turn of the 2010s, Intel went on another acquisition binge, spending $10 billion acquiring Infineon's Wireless Solutions business, security software developer McAfee, among others.

== Acquisitions ==
Date	Company	Business	Country	Value (USD)	Adjusted (USD)	References
October 12, 1988	Digital Video Interactive Technology Venture	Interactive multimedia (General Electric)	United States	Undisclosed	Undisclosed	
July 6, 1989	Jupiter Technologies	Computer networking	United States	Undisclosed	Undisclosed	
May 7, 1991	LAN Systems Products Division	Computer networking	United States	Undisclosed	Undisclosed	
October 14, 1994	Shany Computers Ltd.	Computer networking	Israel	Undisclosed	Undisclosed	
January 17, 1997	Case Technology	Computer networking	Denmark	$72,000,000	$144,000,000	
July 27, 1997	Chips and Technologies	Display chipsets	United States	$420,000,000	$842,000,000	
September 25, 1997	Dayna Communications	Peripherals and modems	United States	$14,000,000	$28,000,000	
September 30, 1997	Corollary, Inc.	Chipsets	United States	Undisclosed	Undisclosed	
October 19, 1998	Shiva Corporation	Computer networking	United States	Undisclosed	Undisclosed	
November 30, 1998	iCat Corporation	E-commerce	United States	Undisclosed	Undisclosed	
March 4, 1999	Level One Communications	Computer networking	United States	$2,200,000,000	$4.252×10^{9}	
July 7, 1999	Softcom Microsystems	Networking chipsets	United States	Undisclosed	Undisclosed	
September 1, 1999	NetBoost	Networking traffic software	United States	Undisclosed	Undisclosed	
September 27, 1999	XLNT Networks	Computer networking	United States	Undisclosed	Undisclosed	
October 5, 1999	iPivot	E-commerce, computer networking	United States	$500,000,000	$966,000,000	
November 15, 1999	Parity Software Development	Communications software	United States	Undisclosed	Undisclosed	
February 4, 2000	Thinkit Technologies	Networking chipsets	United States	Undisclosed	Undisclosed	
February 4, 2000	Ambient Technologies	Networking chipsets	United States	$150,000,000	$280,000,000	
February 24, 2000	Voice Technologies	IP telephony technologies	United States	Undisclosed	Undisclosed	
March 15, 2000	Giga A/S	Computer networking	Denmark	$1,200,000,000	$2.243×10^{9}	
March 21, 2000	Basis Communications	Networking chipsets	United States	$450,000,000	$841,000,000	
April 6, 2000	Kuck & Associates	Compilers	United States	Undisclosed	Undisclosed	
April 10, 2000	Picazo Communications	IP telephony technologies	United States	Undisclosed	Undisclosed	
June 26, 2000	Ford Microelectronics	Mobile technologies	United States	Undisclosed	Undisclosed	
August 10, 2000	DataKinetics	IP telephony technologies	United Kingdom	Undisclosed	Undisclosed	
August 15, 2000	Ziatech	Telecommunications	United States	$240,000,000	$449,000,000	
January 15, 2001	Xircom	Computer networking	United States	$748,000,000	$1.360×10^{9}	
February 26, 2001	VxTel	IP telephony technologies	United States	$550,000,000	$1.000×10^{9}	
March 12, 2001	CAD-UL	Electronic circuit design software	Germany	Undisclosed	Undisclosed	
March 20, 2001	ICP vortex Computersysteme	Computer storage technologies	Germany	Undisclosed	Undisclosed	
April 24, 2001	Cognet Inc.	Telecommunications	United States	Undisclosed	Undisclosed	
April 24, 2001	LightLogic	Telecommunications	United States	Undisclosed	Undisclosed	
April 24, 2001	NSerial	Telecommunications	United States	Undisclosed	Undisclosed	
September 17, 2002	Sparkolor Corporation	Telecommunications	United States	Undisclosed	Undisclosed	
March 1, 2003	Iospan Wireless	Wireless technologies	United States	Undisclosed	Undisclosed	
June 1, 2003	Scale Eight	Scalable software technologies	United States	Undisclosed	Undisclosed	
July 8, 2003	West Bay Semiconductor	Networking chipsets	United States	Undisclosed	Undisclosed	
August 29, 2003	Acirro	NAS software	United States	Undisclosed	Undisclosed	
November 13, 2003	Mobilian Corporation	Wireless technologies	United States	Undisclosed	Undisclosed	
March 25, 2004	Envara	Wireless chipsets	Israel	$40,000,000	$68,000,000	
February 25, 2005	Oplus Technologies	Semiconductor design	Israel	$100,000,000	$165,000,000	
August 17, 2005	Sarvega	XML software	United States	Undisclosed	Undisclosed	
February 8, 2006	Conformative Systems	XML software	United States	Undisclosed	Undisclosed	
September 14, 2007	Havok	Video game middleware	Ireland	$110,000,000	$171,000,000	
August 28, 2008	Opened Hand	Linux software	United Kingdom	Undisclosed	Undisclosed	
October 15, 2008	NetEffect	Semiconductor	United States	$8,000,000	$12,000,000	
February 1, 2009	Swiftfoot Graphics AB	3D computer graphics software	Sweden	Undisclosed	Undisclosed	
June 4, 2009	Wind River Systems	Software	United States	$884,000,000	$1.327×10^{9}	
July 1, 2009	Cilk Arts	Programming languages	United States	Undisclosed	Undisclosed	
August 19, 2009	RapidMind	Electronic circuit design software	Canada	Undisclosed	Undisclosed	
February 1, 2010	Infineon Wireless Solutions	Wireless technologies	Germany	$1,400,000,000	$2.067×10^{9}	
August 19, 2010	McAfee	Internet security	United States	$7,680,000,000	$1.1339×10^{10}	
November 15, 2010	CognoVision	Audience measurement	Canada	$25,000,000	$37,000,000	
March 14, 2011	SySDSoft	Mobile software and technologies	Egypt	Undisclosed	Undisclosed	
March 17, 2011	Silicon Hive	Electronic circuit design software	Netherlands	Undisclosed	Undisclosed	
April 14, 2011	Nordic Edge	Security	Sweden	Undisclosed	Undisclosed	
May 25, 2011	SiPort	Wireless technologies	United States	Undisclosed	Undisclosed	
July 19, 2011	Fulcrum Microsystems	Semiconductor	United States	Undisclosed	Undisclosed	
September 13, 2011	CoFluent Design	Electronic system-level design and verification software	France	Undisclosed	Undisclosed	
September 29, 2011	Telmap	Mobile navigation software	Israel	Undisclosed	Undisclosed	
April 17, 2012	Olaworks	Facial recognition technologies	Korea	$31,000,000	$44,000,000	
July 2, 2012	IDesia	Biometric technologies	Israel	Undisclosed	Undisclosed	
July 13, 2012	Whamcloud	Open-source parallel file systems	United States	Undisclosed	Undisclosed	
November 20, 2012	ZiiLABS	Semiconductor	United Kingdom	$50,000,000	$70,000,000	
February 21, 2013	appMobi	HTML5 developer tools	United States	Undisclosed	Undisclosed	
April 17, 2013	Mashery	Analytics	United States	$120,000,000– $180,000,000	$166,000,000 $249,000,000	
April 28, 2013	Aepona	Computer networking software	Ireland	Undisclosed	Undisclosed	
July 16, 2013	Omek Interactive	Pointing device gesture recognition	Israel	$40,000,000	$55,000,000	
July 22, 2013	Xtreme Insights	Analytics	United States	Undisclosed	Undisclosed	
September 13, 2013	Indisys	Natural language processing	Spain	$26,000,000	$36,000,000	
September 30, 2013	Sensory Networks	Network security	United States	$20,000,000	$28,000,000	
November 8, 2013	Kno	Educational software	United States	Undisclosed	Undisclosed	
November 20, 2013	Hacker League	Hackathon management software	United States	Undisclosed	Undisclosed	
March 3, 2014	Basis Science	Wearable computers	United States	$100,000,000	$136,000,000	
August 13, 2014	LSI Axxia	Semiconductor	United States	$650,000,000	$884,000,000	
December 1, 2014	PasswordBox	Internet security	United States	Undisclosed	Undisclosed	
January 21, 2015	Composyt Light Labs	Wearable computers	Switzerland	Undisclosed	Undisclosed	
February 2, 2015	Lantiq	Wireless technologies	Germany	$345,000,000	$469,000,000	
June 1, 2015	Altera	Semiconductor	United States	$16,700,000,000	$2.2683×10^{10}	
June 18, 2015	Recon Instruments	Wearable computers	Canada	$175,000,000	$238,000,000	
August 14, 2015	Docea Power	Software	France	Undisclosed	Undisclosed	
October 26, 2015	Saffron Technology	Machine learning	United States	Undisclosed	Undisclosed	
January 4, 2016	Ascending Technologies	Unmanned aerial vehicles	Germany	Undisclosed	Undisclosed	
March 8, 2016	Replay Technologies	3D sportscasting technologies	Israel	$175,000,000	$235,000,000	
April 5, 2016	Yogitech	Semiconductor	Italy	Undisclosed	Undisclosed	
May 26, 2016	Itseez	Artificial intelligence	United States	Undisclosed	Undisclosed	
August 9, 2016	Nervana Systems	Artificial intelligence	United States	$350,000,000– $400,000,000	$470,000,000 $537,000,000	
September 6, 2016	Movidius	Semiconductor	Ireland	$400,000,000	$537,000,000	
September 9, 2016	Soft Machines	Semiconductor	United States	$250,000,000	$335,000,000	
November 1, 2016	MAVinci GmbH	Unmanned aerial vehicles	Germany	Undisclosed	Undisclosed	
November 3, 2016	Voke VR	Virtual reality	United States	Undisclosed	Undisclosed	
March 13, 2017	Mobileye	Machine learning	Israel	$15,300,000,000	$2.0096×10^{10}	
July 12, 2018	eASIC	Semiconductor	United States	Undisclosed	Undisclosed	
April 16, 2019	Omnitek	FPGA video acceleration	United Kingdom	Undisclosed	Undisclosed	
June 10, 2019	Barefoot Networks	Computer networking	United States	Undisclosed	Undisclosed	
December 16, 2019	Habana Labs	Machine learning technology	Israel	$2,000,000,000	$2.519×10^{9}	
May 4, 2020	Moovit	Freight transport data	Israel	$900,000,000	$1.120×10^{9}	
May 20, 2020	Rivet Networks	Computer networking	United States	Undisclosed	Undisclosed	
September 24, 2020	Cosmonio	Machine vision	Netherlands	Undisclosed	Undisclosed	
November 9, 2021	Centaur Technology	Semiconductor (VIA Technologies)	US	$125,000,000	$149,000,000	
November 9, 2021	RemoteMyApp	Cloud gaming	Poland	Undisclosed	Undisclosed	
December 6, 2021	Screenovate	Machine vision	Israel	Undisclosed	Undisclosed	
March 31, 2022	Granulate Cloud Solutions	Cloud computing	Israel	$650,000,000	$715,000,000	
May 3, 2022	Siru Innovations	Graphics cards	Finland	Undisclosed	Undisclosed	
June 1, 2022	Codeplay	Software	United Kingdom	Undisclosed	Undisclosed	
