= EPIQ =

EPIQ refer to:

- Étude de la presse d'information quotidienne, French audience measurement organisation
- Škoda Epiq, electric car model
- EPIQ (format), premium large format
