= Volkswagen ID. Cross =

Battery electric subcompact crossover SUV

Overview
- Manufacturer: Volkswagen
- Production: September 2026 – present
- Model years: 2027
- Assembly: Spain: Pamplona, Navarra (Volkswagen Navarra)

Body and chassis
- Class: Subcompact SUV
- Body style: 5-door crossover SUV
- Layout: Front-motor, front-wheel-drive
- Platform: Volkswagen Group MEB+
- Related: Volkswagen ID. Polo; Cupra Raval; Škoda Epiq

Powertrain
- Electric motor: APP290 permanent magnet syncronus motor on Front Axle
- Power output: 114–208 hp (85–155 kW; 116–211 PS)
- Battery: 37 kWh LFP; 52 kWh NMC
- Range: Maximum 265 mi (426 km)

Dimensions
- Wheelbase: 2,601 mm (102.4 in)
- Length: 4,161 mm (163.8 in)
- Width: 1,839 mm (72.4 in)
- Height: 1,588 mm (62.5 in)

The Volkswagen ID. Cross (stylized in all caps with spaced out letters) is a battery electric subcompact SUV produced by Volkswagen. It is considered the electric equivalent of the Volkswagen T-Cross.

== Overview ==
Rear view

The ID. Cross is an electric subcompact crossover SUV that will become the T-Cross' electric equivalent. It will use an updated version of the MEB platform dubbed "MEB+". It was unveiled at the 2025 Munich Motor Show on 8 September. It entered production in September 2026.

The ID. Cross is part of Volkswagen's Electric Urban Car Family, which also comprises the ID. Polo, Cupra Raval, and the Škoda Epiq.

=== Design and features ===
In the exterior there is a floating roof, front and rear light bars, and illuminated VW badges. Physical buttons are also present instead of capacitive touch buttons used in earlier ID. models. A 13-inch touchscreen and a 11-inch digital instrument cluster are present.

The "Pure Positive" design language debuts with the new ID. Cross. The concept version's paint job is a shade of green named Urban Jungle and the interior is in a shade of beige dubbed Vanilla Chai.

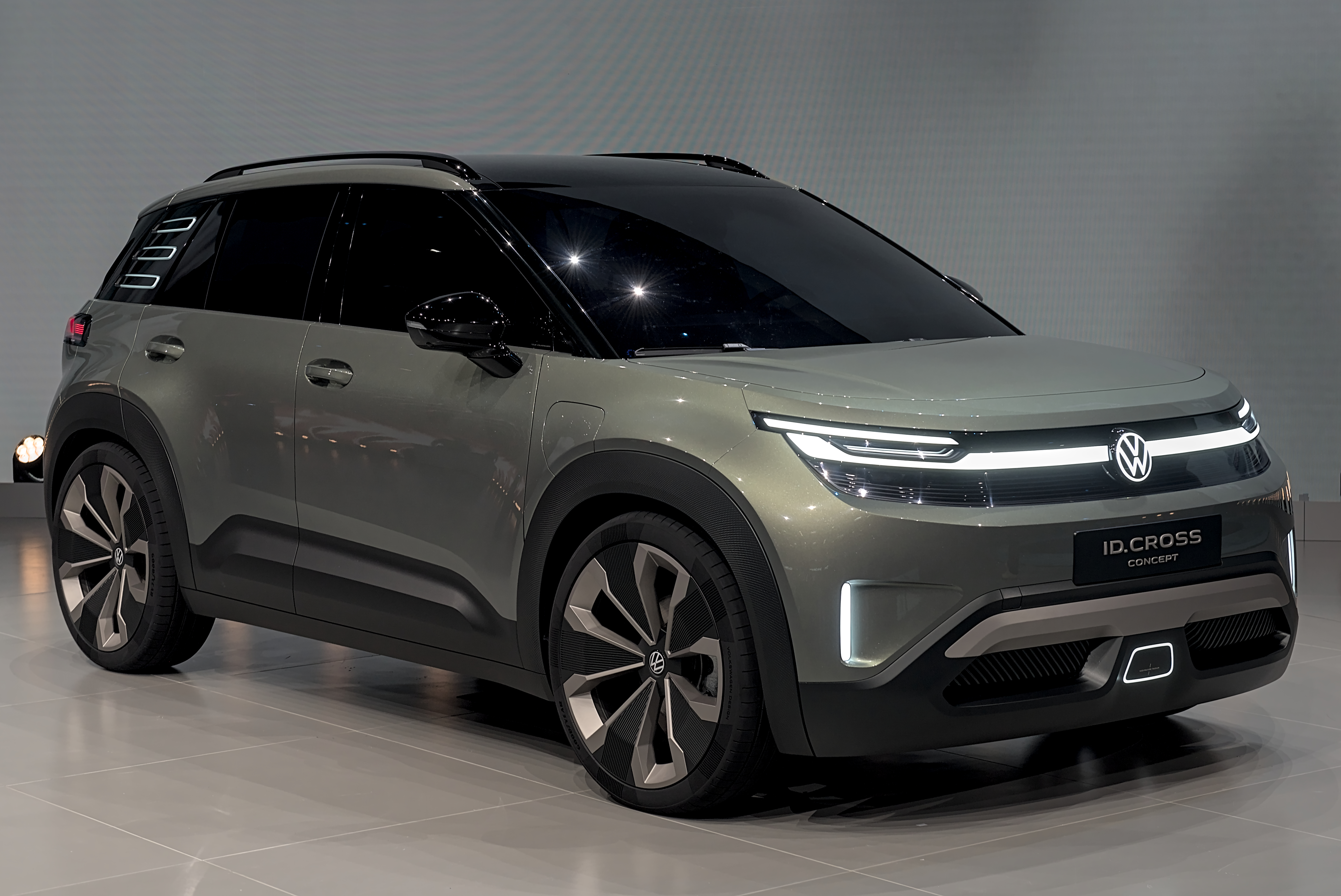
Volkswagen ID. Cross Concept

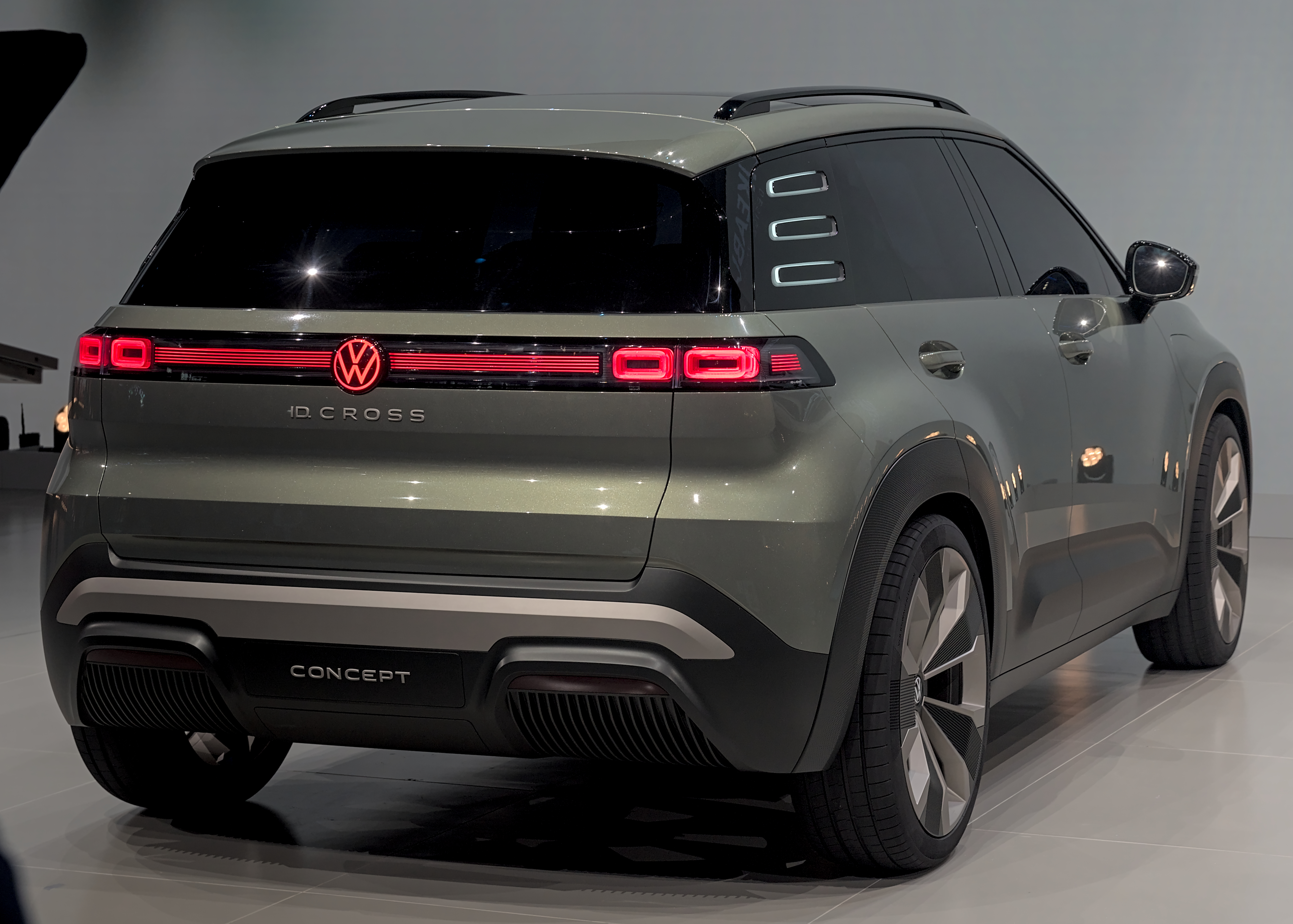
Rear view

== Powertrain ==
Just like with the ID. Polo, the ID. Cross uses a front-mounted APP290 Axial Parallel Position permanent-magnet synchronous motor which can produce 114 horsepower (85 kW; 116 PS), 133 horsepower (99 kW; 135 PS) paired with the 37-kWh LFP battery, or 208 horsepower (155 kW; 211 PS) with the 52-kWh NMC battery. As the name suggests, the motor produces a torque output of approximately 290 Nm (around 214 lb-ft), providing strong acceleration for urban driving. The ID. Cross is based on the MEB+ platform used for front-wheel-drive vehicles, also shared with the ID. Polo, Cupra Raval, and Škoda Epiq.
