= Structured ASIC platform =

Structured ASIC is an intermediate technology between ASIC and FPGA, offering high performance, a characteristic of ASIC, and low NRE cost, a characteristic of FPGA. Using structured ASIC allows products to be introduced quickly to market, to have lower cost and to be designed with ease.

In a FPGA, interconnects and logic blocks are programmable after fabrication, offering high flexibility of design and ease of debugging in prototyping. However, the capability of FPGAs to implement large circuits is limited, in both size and speed, due to complexity in programmable routing, and significant space occupied by programming elements, e.g. SRAMs, MUXes. On the other hand, ASIC design flow is expensive. Every different design needs a complete different set of masks. The structured ASIC is a solution between these two. It has basically the same structure as a FPGA, but being mask-programmable instead of field-programmable, by configuring one or several via layers between metal layers. Every SRAM configuration bit can be replaced by a choice of putting a via or not between metal contacts.

A number of commercial vendors have introduced structured ASIC products. They have a wide range of configurability, from a single via layer to 6 metal and 6 via layers. Altera's Hardcopy-II, eASIC's Nextreme are examples of commercial structured ASICs.

== See also ==
- Gate array
- Altera Corp - "HardCopy II Structured ASICs"
- eASIC Corp - "Nextreme Structured ASIC"
