= Mareco Index Bosnia =

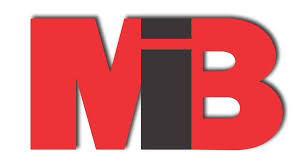
MIB logo

Mareco Index Bosnia (MIB) is public opinion, media and market research company, located in Bosnia and Herzegovina.

== History ==
Mareco Index Bosnia was founded in 1996.

== International membership ==
- Gallup International – full voting status from year: 2000
- TNS/KANTAR Group – The Largest public opinion, media, market research company in the world.
- World Association of Public Opinion (WAPOR)
- European Society for Opinion and Marketing Research (ESOMAR)
- American Marketing Association (AMA)

== Regional Network ==
MIB has its network in Serbia, Montenegro, North Macedonia, Bulgaria, Romania, Ukraine, Albania, Hungary, Poland, Slovakia, Czech Republic.

== AdEx – Advertising Expenditure ==
Advertising Expenditure (also known as AdSpend) shows money spent by companies in Bosnia and Herzegovina on advertising. Advertising expenditure analyzes the main advertising media, such as television, newspapers, magazines, radio and outdoor advertising. AdEx shows the total spending nationally, by company/advertiser, by product area, by product category, by brand, by brandkind, by day/week/month/year. It is possible to merge AdEx data with Audience/Readers Measurement data.

== TAM – TV Audience Measurement ==
In every city where the audience is measured, MIB choose a group of homes at random to represent the population – a process known as audience measurement. With the authorization of the family members, each television is equipped with a device called a peoplemeter, which identifies and records which channels are being watched. By fixed telephone line and/or GSM networks, the device sends out information when viewers changes channels to a central collection point managed by MIB, which processes, analyzes, and distributes the data to clients. MIB measures up to eight members of each household. Participants are from both genders, and must be at least four years old.
