= CognoVision =

- Type: audience measurement software
- Founded: 2006
- Founder: Haroon F. Mirza (CEO), Dr. Shahzad Malik (CTO), Faizal Javer (President & COO)
- Headquarters: Toronto, Canada
- Services: digital signage metrics & retail intelligence
- Website: https://cognovision.com

CognoVision Solutions Inc. was a Toronto-based provider of real-time audience measurement and retail intelligence solutions. The company created Anonymous Video Analytics (AVA) software that uses small video cameras and real-time Computer vision algorithms to detect faces and people for measuring viewership of Digital signage or estimating traffic flow patterns in a retail store.

On November 15, 2010, it was announced that Intel Corporation, the world's largest semiconductor chip maker, had acquired CognoVision - the acquisition closed in September 2010. Intel Corporation announced August 8, 2011 that Anonymous Video Analytics from Cognovision would be the underlying technology powering their Intel AIM Suite service.

== History ==
CognoVision was founded in 2006. The privately financed company was started by Haroon F. Mirza (CEO), Dr. Shahzad Malik (CTO), and Faizal Javer (President & COO). The founders all met while students at Carleton University in Ottawa, Ontario, Canada in 2000. Each founder had independently relocated to Toronto: Malik completed his Ph.D. at University of Toronto, Javer was expanding a mattress manufacturing business from Western Canada to Ontario, and Mirza was working at Cadbury Adams.

CognoVision was acquired by Intel in 2010. In January 2018, its domain was acquired by marketingsolz.com, and re-directed to a technology and business news platform.

== Privacy ==
CognoVision's technology respects privacy by never recording images or video footage, and relying on pattern detection algorithms that only look for general characteristics of a human face rather than features which can uniquely identify an individual. Once the AVA program has determined pixel patterns of a human face, the software categorizes how long the display is viewed, the approximate gender and approximate age of the viewer.

However, CognoVision technology was still a target of privacy groups pushing for legislation to prevent more intrusive biometric recognition technologies from becoming mainstream. As stated in a report presented at the 2010 World Privacy Forum,

The Marketplace Station is using CognoVision’s AIM technology, which means that the images of shoppers are not supposed to be recorded. However, just because the companies have decided that the lack of storage or recording of the data is equivalent to privacy does not mean that consumers should be left in the dark about such technologies. And it does not mean that customers in these stores should be subject to this activity without consenting to it.

== Timeline ==
- May 2006 - CognoVision founded
- Apr 2007 - CognoVision ranked as semi-finalist in TiEQuest 2007 Business Venture Competition
- June 2007 - CognoVision ranked 2nd in MaRS Upstart Contest
- Feb 2008 - CognoVision launched its solutions at the Digital Signage Expo 2008
- Oct 2008 - CognoVision-powered nCAP wins Artisan Complete a 2008 DIGI Award for Best Product with Audience Measurement
- Mar 2009 - CognoVision wins rAVe DS 2009 Champ Award: Most innovative DS software product: CognoVision's AIM System
- Nov 2009 - CognoVision wins 2009 DIGI Award for Best New Audience Measurement Package
- Nov 2009 - CognoVision named to the CIX Top 20 Innovative Companies of 2009
- Dec 2009 - Canadian Innovation Exchange names CognoVision as Canada's 2009 Digital Media and Innovation Leader
- Mar 2010 - CognoVision wins rAVe DS 2010 Champ Award: Best DS Software Add-on App
- Apr 2010 - Branham300 names CognoVision to Top 20 ICT Up & Coming Companies
- Sep 2010 - CognoVision acquired by Intel Corporation
- Jan 2018 - CognoVision domain acquired by marketingsolz.com
