= Volkswagen ID. Polo =

Battery electric supermini car

Overview
- Manufacturer: Volkswagen
- Production: June 2026 – present
- Model years: 2027
- Assembly: Spain: Martorell, Barcelona, Catalonia
- Designer: Andreas Mindt (head of design)

Body and chassis
- Class: Supermini (B-segment)
- Body style: 5-door hatchback
- Layout: Front-motor, front-wheel-drive
- Platform: Volkswagen Group MEB Entry
- Related: Volkswagen ID. Cross; Cupra Raval; Škoda Epiq

Powertrain
- Electric motor: APP290 PMSM
- Power output: 114–208 hp (85–155 kW; 116–211 PS); 223 hp (166 kW; 226 PS) (GTI)
- Battery: 38 kWh LFP; 56 kWh NMC
- Electric range: 203–280 mi (327–451 km) (WLTP)
- Plug-in charging: DC: 88–125 kW

Dimensions
- Wheelbase: 2,600 mm (102.4 in)
- Length: 4,053 mm (159.6 in)
- Width: 1,816 mm (71.5 in)
- Height: 1,530 mm (60.2 in)
- Curb weight: 1,575 kg (3,472 lb)

The Volkswagen ID. Polo is a battery electric supermini car unveiled by Volkswagen on 29 April 2026. It is the first electric Volkswagen to adopt the new naming scheme for the Volkswagen ID. series, using existing nameplates.

== Overview ==
The ID. Polo is the production version of the Volkswagen ID.2all concept was first shown in 2023. It is expected to have a starting price of €25,000, or roughly US$29,000. The name was changed to ID. Polo ahead of the IAA Mobility 2025 show in Munich, Germany, where the ID. Polo's pre-production version was revealed.

The ID. Polo is the first electric car of the Volkswagen ID. series to use an existing nameplate, followed by the ID. Cross, the electric equivalent of the T-Cross. It will be sold alongside the internal combustion engine Volkswagen Polo.

Rear view

Interior

Powertrain bay (A/C compressor visible on top)

The Retro mode driver's display.

=== Design and features ===
The front end uses a stubby, sloped bonnet. Sleek headlights that are similar to the design used for the ID.7 are also present, alongside a light-up VW logo. The rear door handles are hidden. The rear light bar and roof spoiler are inherited from the ID.2all. In the interior a 330-millimetre (12.9 in) central touchscreen and a 280-millimetre (10.9 in) digital driver's display are expected, alongside physical switches for the audio and climate controls.

== Volkswagen ID. Polo GTI ==
The ID. Polo has also received a GTI version, which was previewed by the ID.GTI concept, first shown in 2023, alongside the ID.2all.

The ID. Polo GTI was unveiled on May 15, 2026.

Volkswagen ID. Polo GTI

Rear view

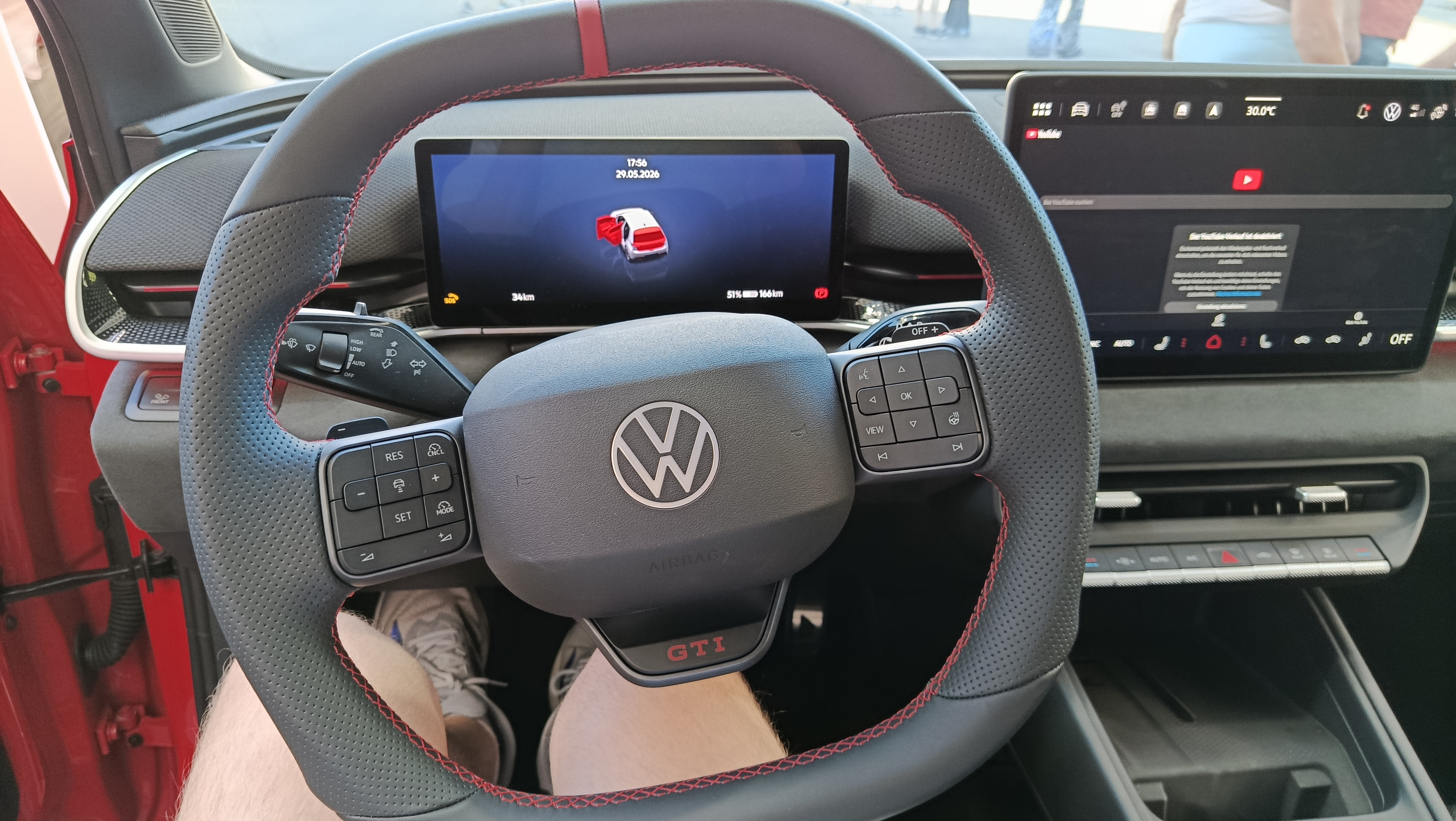
Interior

== Powertrain ==
The ID. Polo is offered with two battery options a 37 kWh LFP and 52 kWh lithium nickel manganese cobalt oxides (NMC) batteries.

Initially at launch there are three power options: the 37 kWh battery is available with either a 116 bhp (87 kW; 118 PS) or 134 bhp (100 kW; 136 PS) electric motor, and the 52 kWh battery is equipped with a 208 bhp (155 kW; 211 PS) motor. A future GTI version is expected to be equipped with a 223 bhp (166 kW; 226 PS) motor but not at the time of the launch.

Charging speeds depends on battery size; the 37 kWh battery can charged up to 90 kW DC and the larger 52 kWh up to 105 kW.

Consumption in city is reported to be below 11 kWh/100km, during eco drive with auxiliaries off.

== Concept cars ==
=== Volkswagen ID. Life (2021) ===
The Volkswagen ID. Life was the first VW concept car intended to foresee an upcoming supermini car for the ID. series — and even to replace Volkswagen Polo, in the early plans of replacing the entire range by BEV models — as a crossover SUV model, designed by Klaus Zyciora and Jozef Kabaň, who said "Volkswagen's design language always has to move in a more timeless direction. It fits the brand. We want to be authentic and clear and use real materials.” However, in 2022, the project based on this concept has fallen out of favour, to be replaced by models designed closer to existing VW models.

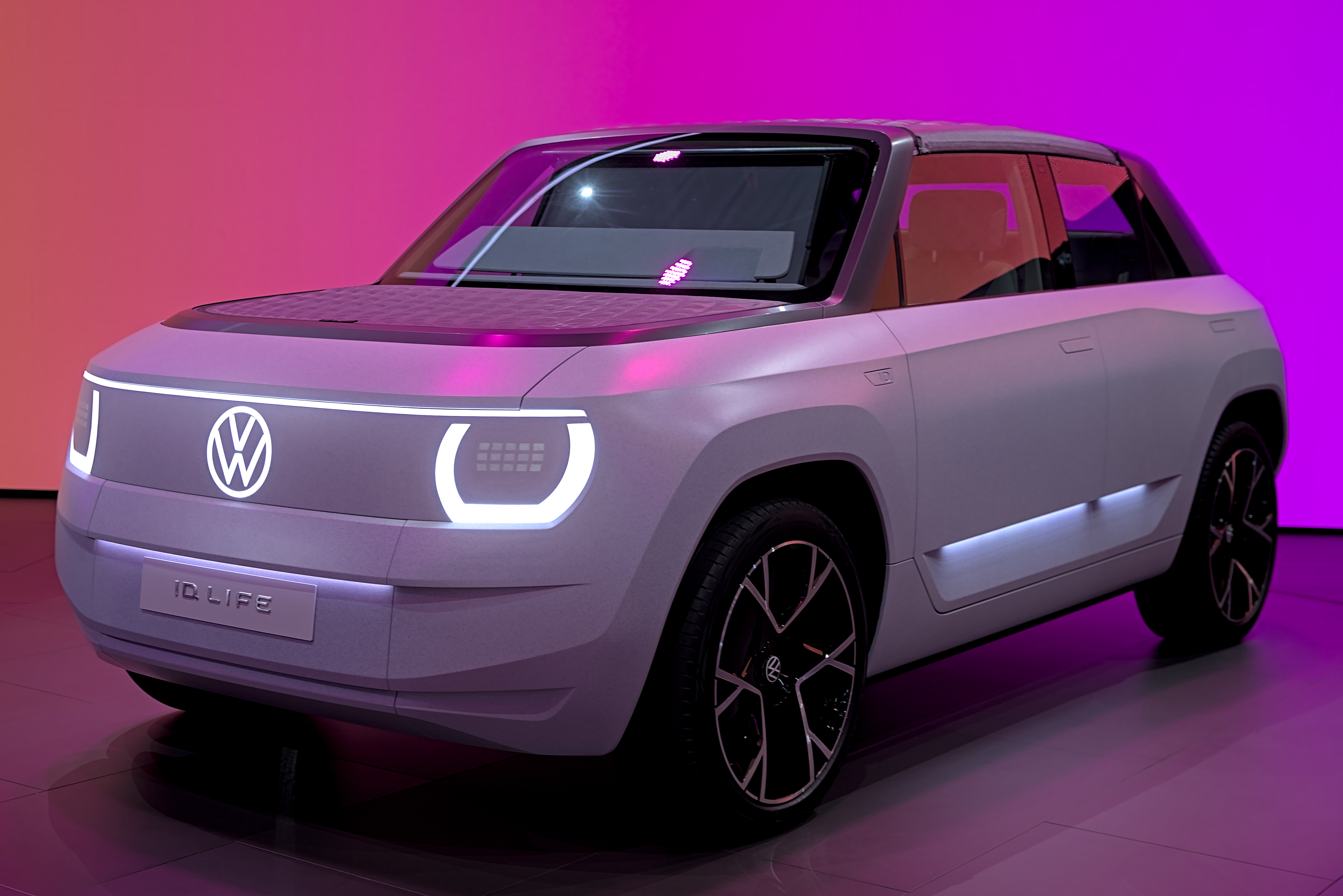
Volkswagen ID. Life

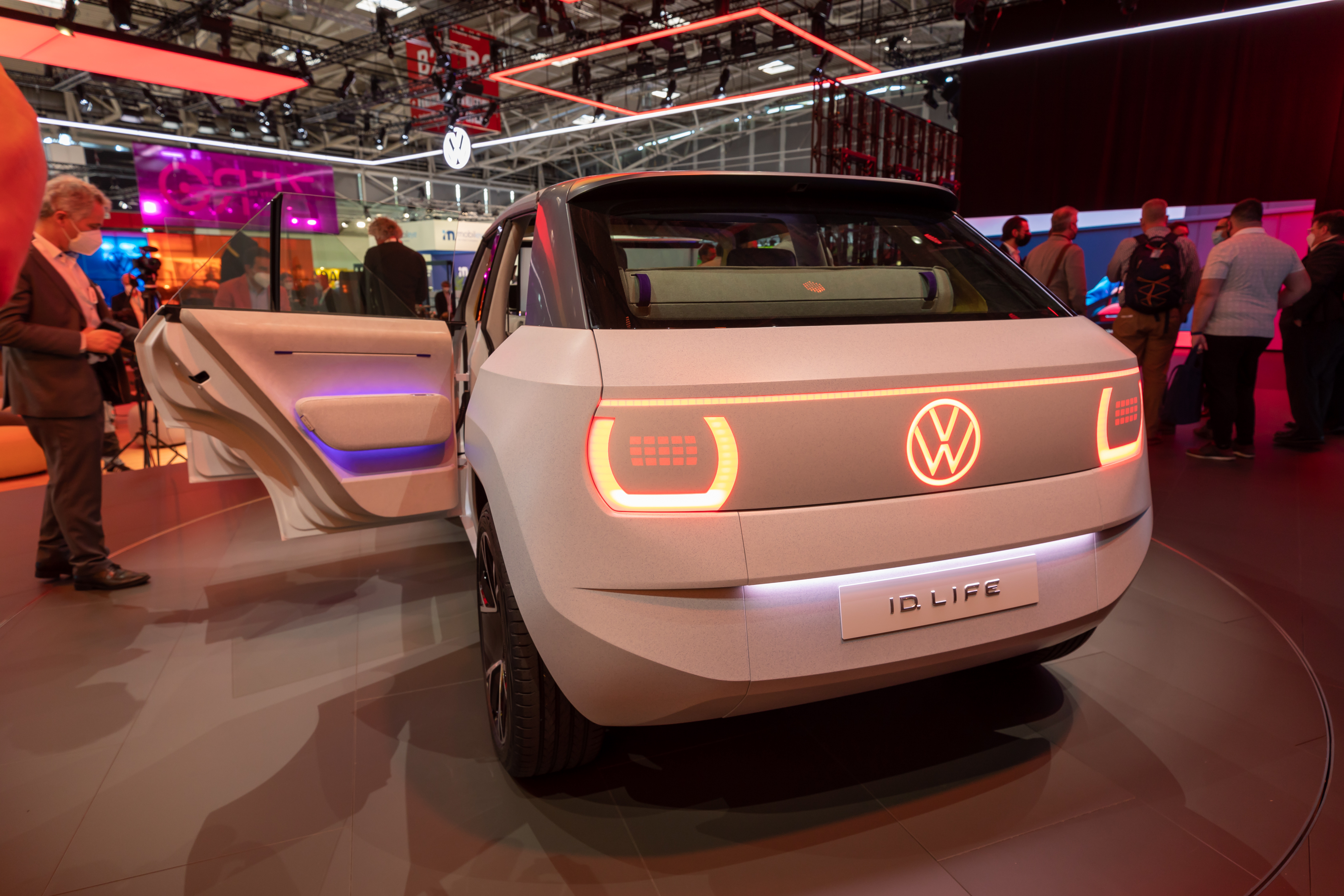
Rear view

=== Volkswagen ID.2all (2023) ===
The Volkswagen ID.2all is a concept car first shown publicly on March 15, 2023, foreseeing the ID. Polo, then intended to be called Volkswagen ID.2, following the early Volkswagen ID. series nameplates. The ID.2all uses a shortened and simplified version of the MEB electric platform called the MEB Entry, with a targeted range of 450 km (280 mi) and producing 166 kW (223 hp), with a 0–100 km/h (0–62 mph) time of 7 seconds.

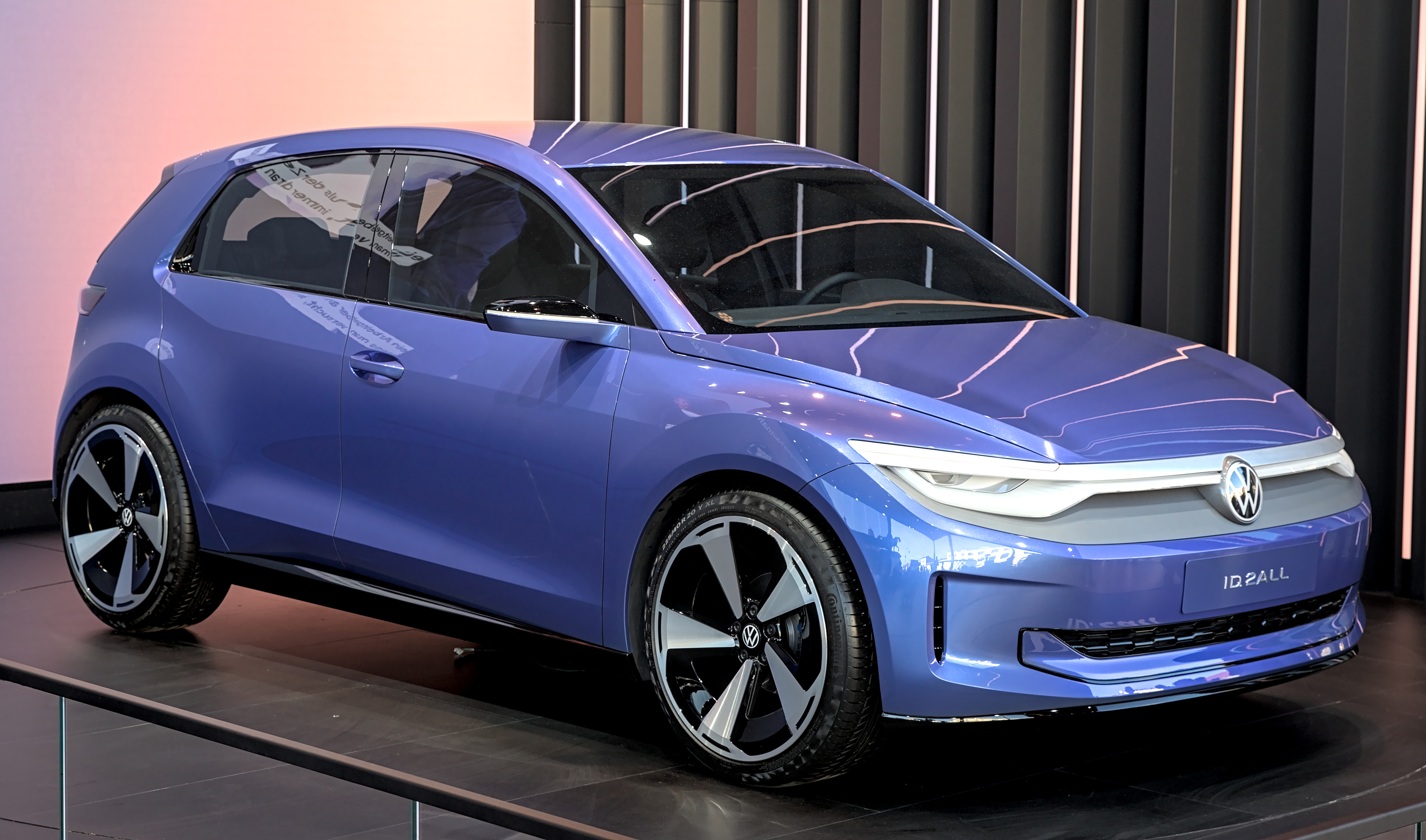
Volkswagen ID.2all

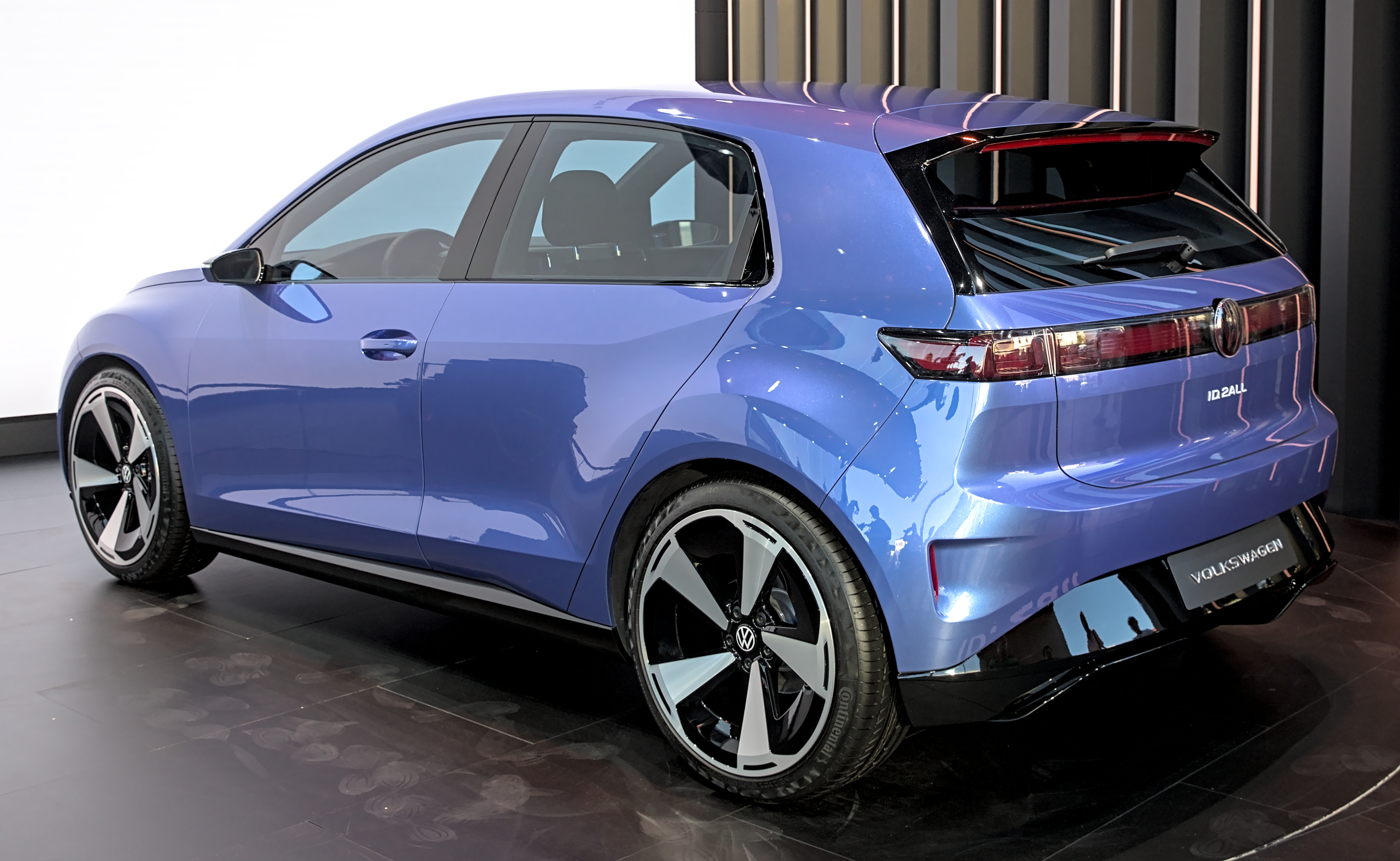
Rear view

=== Volkswagen ID.GTI (2023) ===
A sport version of the ID.2all was introduced as the Volkswagen ID.GTI in September 2023.

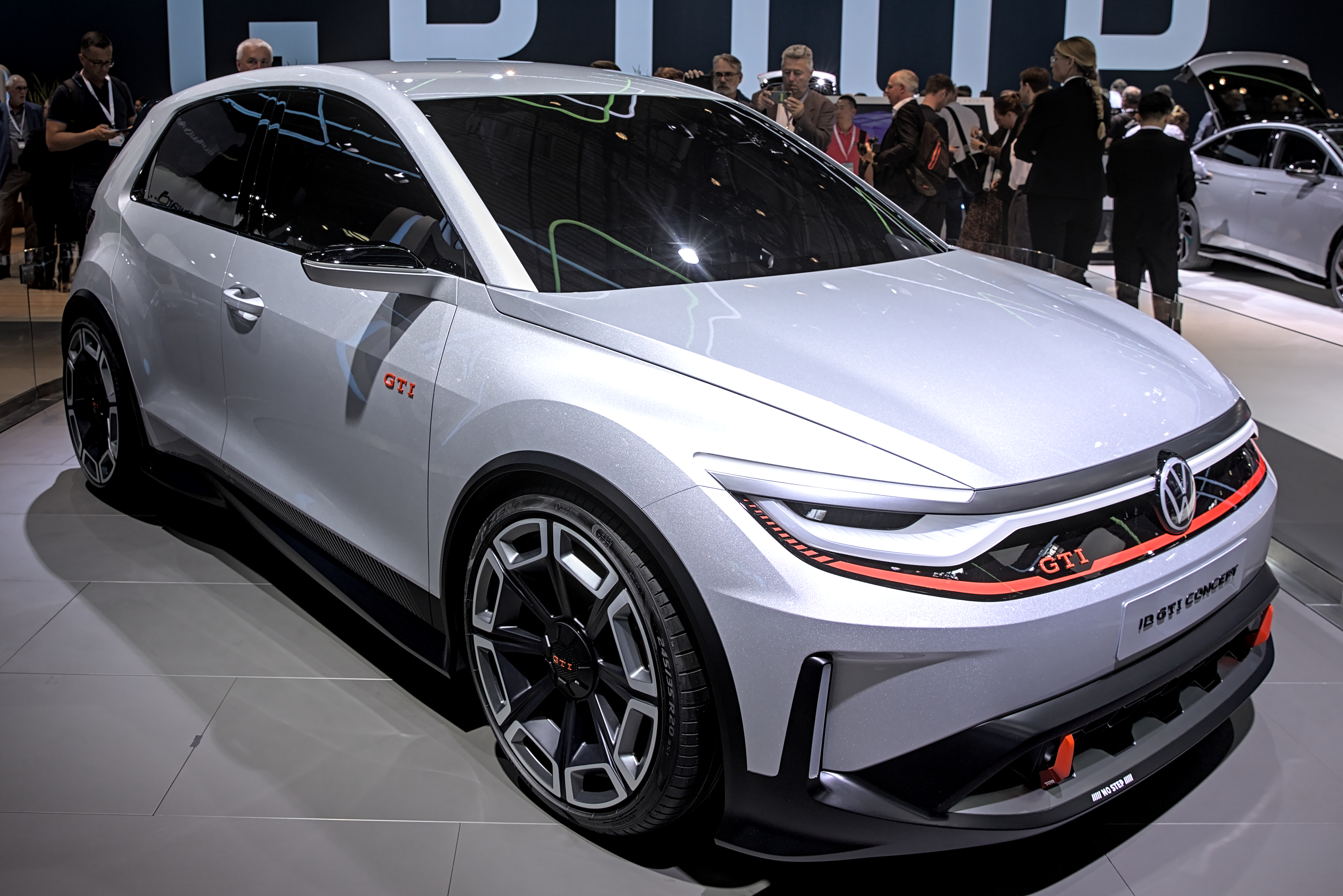
Volkswagen ID.GTI

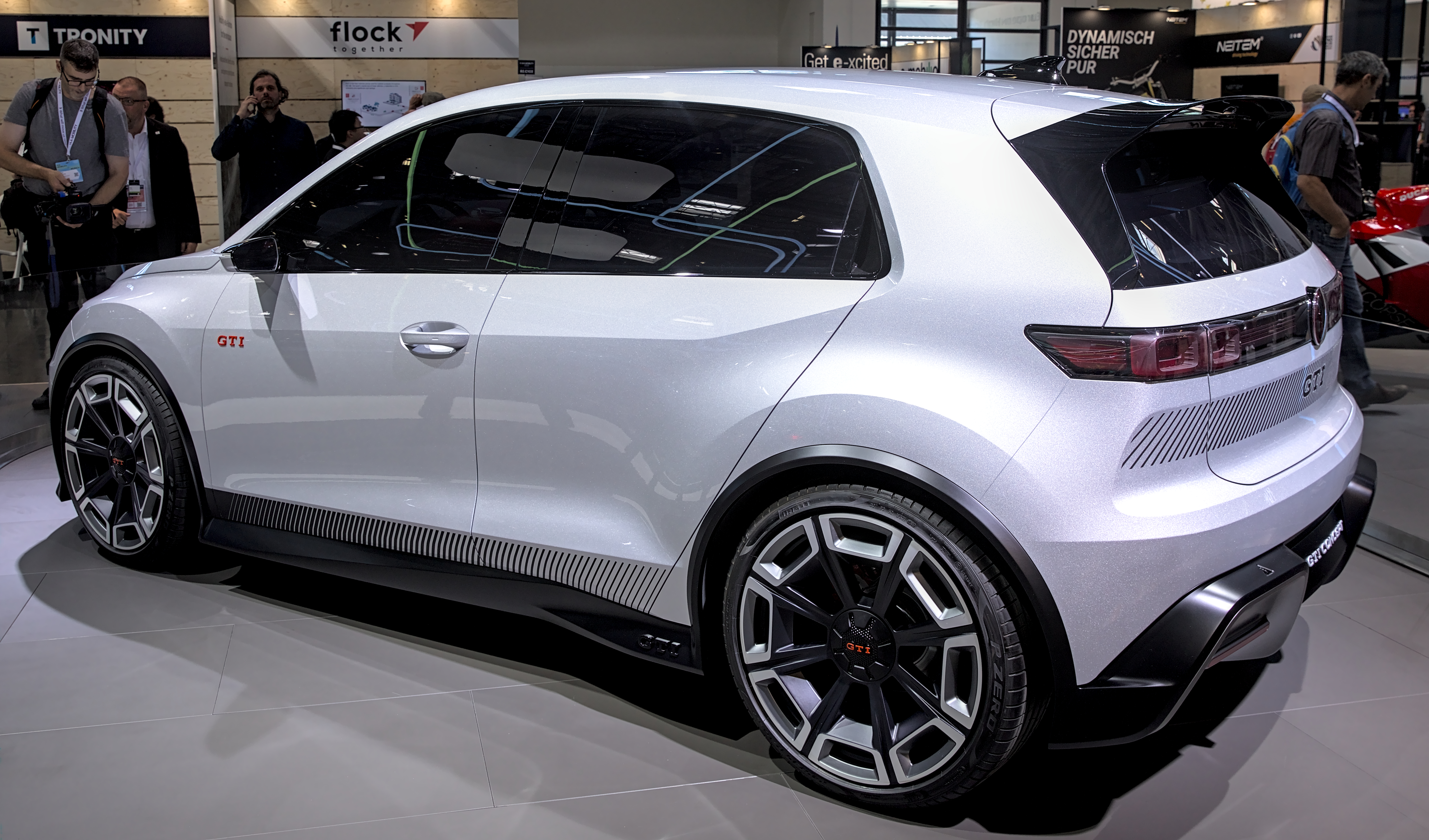
Rear view
