= WikiFactor =

A wikiFactor is a measure of the 'popularity' of a wiki website. It is based on the Hirsch h-index which is commonly used to measure the impact a scientist has had in the literature.

The wikiFactor is simply the number of pages in the wiki (wF) that have had more than 1000 multiplied by wF visits.

For example a wikiFactor (wF) of, say, 20 – means that page number 20 in the ranking of pages visited has received 20,000 or more visits, whereas page 21 has not yet reached 21,000 visits.

Example rank list excerpt (wikiFactor = 38)
Rank	Example view count	Factorous page?
36	41682	Yes
37	41232	Yes
38	38221	Yes
39	38117	No
40	36656	No

The WikiIndex site uses the wikiFactor as one of the measures for classifying the importance of a Wiki.

== See also ==
- Audience measurement
