= Audience measurement =

Assessment of the scale and composition of the target audience

Audience measurement calculates how many people are in an audience, usually in relation to radio listenership and television viewership, but also in relation to newspaper and magazine readership and, increasingly, web traffic. The term is sometimes used with regard to practices that help broadcasters and advertisers determine who is listening, rather than how many people are listening. In some parts of the world, the resulting numbers are referred to as audience share; in other places, the broader term market share is used. This broader meaning is also known as audience research. Measurements are broken down by media market, which corresponds to large and small metropolitan areas.

== Methods ==
=== Diaries ===
The diary was one of the first methods of recording information. However, this is prone to mistakes, forgetfulness and subjectivity. Data is collected down to the level of listener opinion of individual songs cross-referenced against age, race, and economic status in listening sessions sponsored by oldies- and mix-formatted stations. IBOPE was the first real-time service for audience measurement in the world, beginning in São Paulo in 1942.

=== Electronic ===
The audience measurement of U.S. television has relied on sampling to obtain estimated audience sizes in which advertisers determine the value of such acquisitions. According to The Television Will Be Revolutionized, Amanda D. Lotz writes that during the 1960s and 1970s, Nielsen Media Research introduced the Storage Instantaneous Audimeter, a device that sent daily viewing information to the company's computers using phone lines and made national daily ratings available by 1973. Although the audimeters did not supply sufficient information about audience demographics, they allowed Nielsen to establish diary reports that presented insight into the audience. According to Lotz, the Nielsen sample included approximately 1,700 audimeter homes and a rotating panel of approximately 850 diary respondents. Nielsen was the controlling factor of audience measurement for national network television.

Networks blamed Nielsen for inaccurate rating measurements in the mid-2000s, and the company implemented its automated Local People Meter (LPM) technology. The LPM marked the shift from active, diary-based local measurement to passive, meter-monitored measurement of local markets. Technologically, the LPM is similar to the original Nielsen People Meter; the key advance was that the LPM provided accurate measurements of local markets. The LPM system has allowed the industry to measure year-round, rather than the quarterly "sweeps" periods. Researchers believed that the LPM more accurately reported the full range of programming watched, including channel-surfing. Arbitron's Portable People Meter uses a microphone to pick up and record subaudible tones embedded in broadcasts by an encoder on each station or network, and has been used to track in-store radio.

The introduction of digital terrestrial television (DTT) complicates audience measurement. In a multisignal context, with new content in the face of technological convergence, the correct representation of viewing behaviors faces methodological challenges. New methodologies (audio or video matching, watermarking) are needed to measure digital television audiences. Measurement with audimeters faces the dual challenges of analog and digital measurement in a mixed television broadcast.

Because of the Internet, many businesses can sell outside their local markets. This helps them offer niche items that would face challenges in finding customers in their specific market area. In the Journal of Advertising Research, Chris Anderson writes: "For some internet-based businesses, locality no longer regulates the market." Offered wider choices, consumers award fewer of their "votes" to the big hits and more to specialized niche choices. According to Anderson, people always wanted more choices but their desires were obscured by distribution bottlenecks imposed by cost or locality.

New digital technology initially complicated in-home measurement systems. The DVR seemed incompatible with a Nielsen box, which was designed to measure the frequency of a television signal to ascertain the channel being viewed. Since a DVR always produces the same frequency, an active-passive (A/P) meter could be developed to read audio tracks of a particular program instead of the frequency of the television signal. Other challenges to the industry were digital cable, the Internet, and viewing devices other than televisions. As new ways of measurement became available and users could be monitored for content and use, concern arose that sampling techniques might become obsolete. The increasing fragmentation of viewing with different technologies posed difficulties in reporting viewer numbers for content. Nielsen began rolling out its "anytime anywhere media measurement" initiative in 2010, which includes DVR views in its television figures. GTAM (Global Television Audience Metering) is based on the development of audience-metering technology to deal with the challenges in measuring the viewing behavior of consumer households across several platforms (TV, Internet, mobile devices). A/P meters would be replaced by GTAM meters, which were expected to use a combination of active and passive measurement technologies. Unlike A/P meters, however, they would not require a physical connection to a media device.

== New media ==
MediaWiki software can be equipped with the HitCounters extension as a form of audience measurement and determining wikiFactor, a rough measurement of a wiki website's popularity. With the increased popularity of webinars and video conferencing due to the remote work requirements of the COVID-19 pandemic, a set of direct and anonymous audience engagement tools such as Mentimeter and Actymeter became popular.

Nielsen//NetRatings measures Internet and digital media audiences with telephone and Internet surveys. Nielsen BuzzMetrics measures consumer-generated media. Other companies collecting information on Internet use include comScore, Wakoopa, and Hitwise, which measure hits on Internet pages. Visible Measures focuses on measuring online video consumption and distribution across all video advertising and content. GfK's Cross Media Measurement Solutions measures offline sales after TV, Internet, and mobile exposure.

Sightcorp, TruMedia, Quividi, relEYEble, stickyPiXEL, Cognitec, goCount and CognoVision provide real-time audience data, including size, attention span and demographics, using video analytics to detect, track and classify viewers of digital displays. Networked Insights measures online audiences, and released a report ranking television shows by social-media interaction. According to the study, half of the shows on Networked Insights' top-10 list did not appear on the Nielsen Media Research (NMR) list.

== Demographics ==
The demographic or "demos" of a show's audience is measured, in ten year age bands (except for kids and teens). Advertisers typically look to the results in the "key demo" of adults aged 25 to 54, who are thought to have the most disposable income, or 18 to 24, who are thought to not yet have established brand loyalties.

These demos are often notated in abbreviated form:

- P2+ = Persons aged 2 or more
- P6–11 = Persons (kids) aged 6 to 11
- P12–17 = Persons (teens) aged 12 to 17
- P18–24 = Persons aged 18 to 24
- P18–49 or A18–49 = Persons or Adults aged 18 to 49
- P25–54 or A25–54 = Persons or Adults aged 25 to 54
- P55–64 = Persons aged 55 to 64
- P65+ = Persons aged 65 or more

== Ratings point ==
A ratings point is a measure of viewership of a television show. One television ratings point (Rtg or TVR) represents one percent of television households in the surveyed area in a given minute. In 2004, there were an estimated 109.6 million television households in the United States; one national ratings point represented 1,096,000 households for the 2004–05 season. When used for a broadcast program, the average rating for the duration of the show is typically given. Ratings points are often used for specific demographics, rather than households. For example, a ratings point for the key 25- to 54-year-old demographic is equivalent to one percent of all 25- to 54-year-olds in the country.

A Rtg or TVR differs from a share point in being the percentage of all households; a share point is one percent of all households watching television at the time. The share of a broadcast is often significantly higher than the rating, especially when overall TV viewing is low. A low share may lead to the cancellation of a TV program.

=== GRPs and TRPs ===
Gross rating points (GRPs) or target rating points (TRPs) are chiefly used to measure the performance of TV-based advertising campaigns, and are the sum of the TVRs of each commercial spot of the campaign. An ad campaign might require a certain number of GRPs in a particular demographic for the duration of the campaign. The GRP of a campaign is the percentage of viewers multiplied by the average number of ads viewed.

Net reach is the total of all audiences exposed to a vehicle, excluding duplicate viewership.

Weeks	Gross reach	Total reach	Duplication	Total duplication	Net reach
Week 1	1,000	1,000	--	--	1,000
Week 2	2,000	3,000	(300)	(300)	2,700
Week 3	1,500	4,500	(900)	(1,200)	3,300
Week 4	1,200	5,700	(1,000)	(2,200)	3,500

== Criticism ==
Standard audience surveys collect data on audience size and basic demographics. Audience quality is inferred from an audience's demographic profile, but do not measure audience engagement.

Audience-research methods were questioned during the 1990s with the arrival of new media, particularly digital media, and changes in public media habits. People meters, which recorded household viewing by noting the station to which a TV was tuned, failed to capture new viewing habits such as recording programs for playback at a later time or watching a podcast or download on a device such as a tablet or computer. Video on Demand (VoD) enables consumers to decide when to watch programs, and smartphones enable consumers to choose where to access content. Media research companies have been forced to devise new methodologies capable of tracking new and unprecedented viewing habits across a diverse range of different platforms.

Audiences often use several media at the same time; a teenager might be plugged into a radio with earphones while working on the Internet, where they are scanning online newspapers and magazines. Media research companies were poorly equipped for the challenge of simultaneous consumption across several platforms, but is slowly adapting.

Data collected by people meters is available the morning after programs have aired, but data collected in diaries requires more time to analyse. Radio surveys, still used for radio ratings in a number of countries, are normally available quarterly. The time lag in reporting fails to give advertisers sufficient lead time to take corrective action during a campaign.

Other questions have been raised about diary-based data-collection methods. The expectation that diarists participating in a radio sample will accurately record their listening at 15-minute intervals has been challenged.

Surveying listeners for preferences has been criticised as inflexible. Listeners complain that radio lacks variety and depth, but measurement methods facilitate further refinement of already-minutely-programmed formats rather than an overhaul. In the US, listeners hear old favorites rather than new music. Data obtained by some audience-measurement methods is detailed for individual songs and how they are reacted to by each age, racial, and economic group the station seeks to attract. This approach leads to recognizable songs (such as those by the Beatles) which score well with a cross-section of listeners.

== Companies by country ==
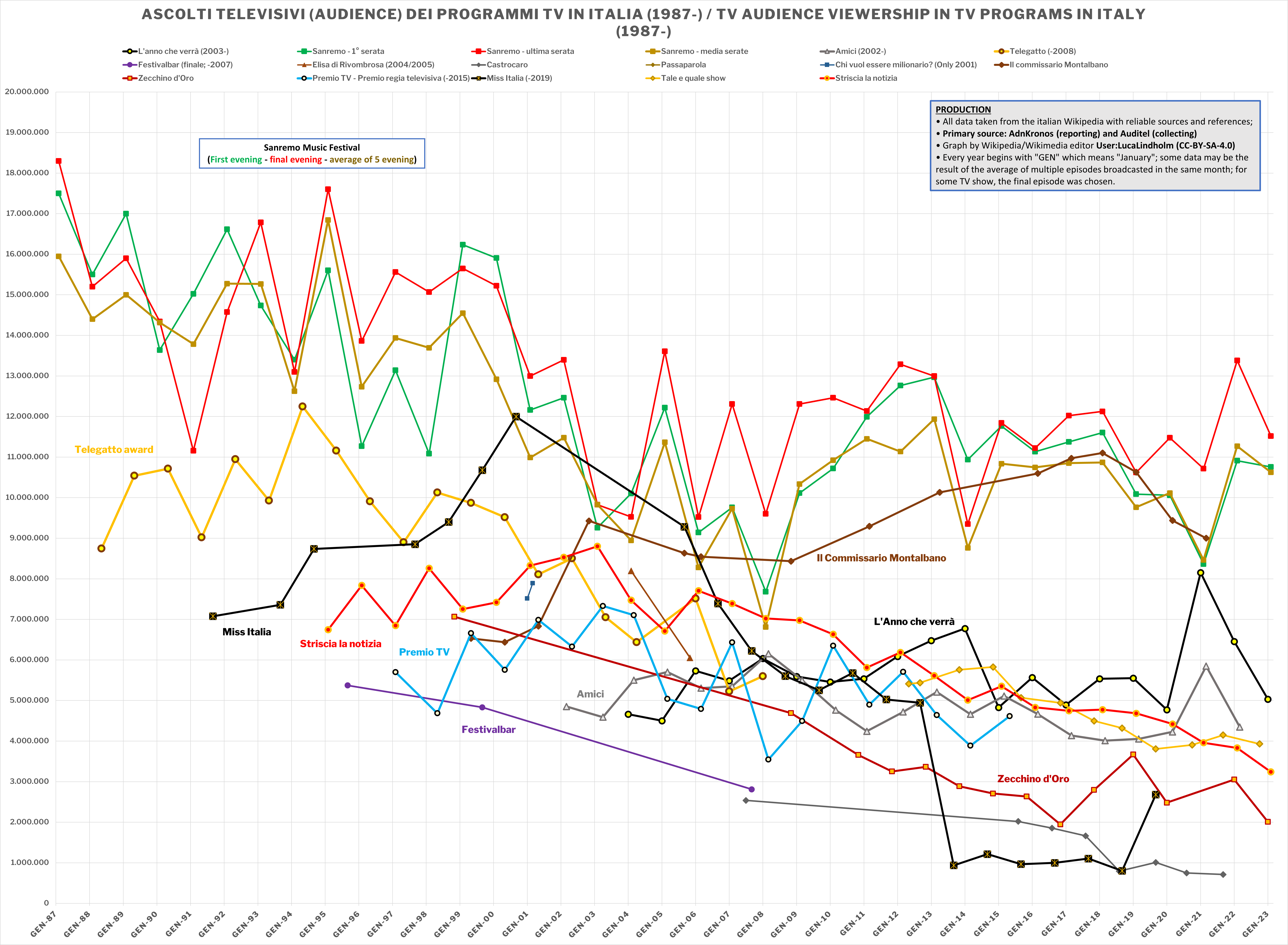
Audience viewership of TV programs in Italy since 1987

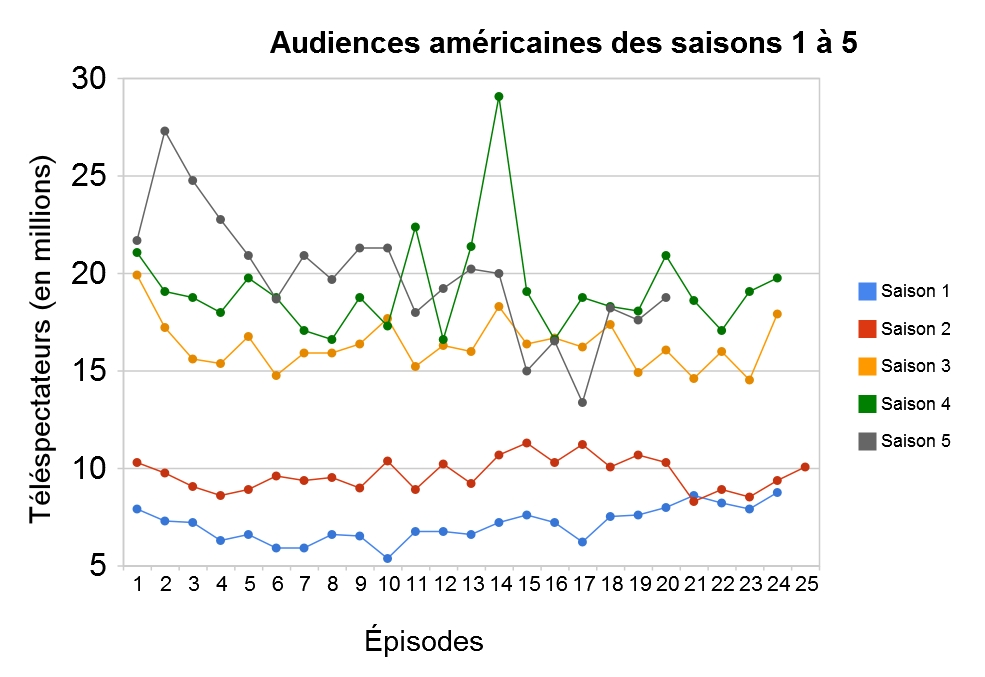
Viewership of The X-Files from 1993 to 1998

In most countries, the advertising industry endorses a media-research company as its provider of audience measurement. The methodology used by the provider becomes known as the "industry currency" for audience measurement. Industry members fund audience research and share the findings. In a few countries where the industry is fragmented or where there is no industry association, two or more competing organisations may provide audience measurement services; such countries are said to have no industry currency.

Four methods of data collection are used to survey broadcast audiences: interviews, diaries, meters, and scanning and modelling. Research companies use different methodologies, depending on where (and when) media is used and the cost of data collection. All methods involve sampling: taking a representative sample of the population, recording media use, and extrapolating it to the general population.

- In Australia, television ratings are collected by three main organizations. OzTAM serves metropolitan areas, and Regional TAM serves regions serviced by three commercial networks. Ratings are collected year-round, but findings are not made public for about 10 weeks in the summer to allow the networks to experiment with schedules. Radio surveys are conducted by GfK.
- In Argentina, radio and television measurement is by Ibope and Infortecnica.
- In Armenia, television ratings are collected by Admosphere-Armenia CJSC.
- In Austria, measurement is by GfK at the request of Verein Arbeitsgemeinschaft TELETEST (AGTT).
- In Belgium TV and radio measurements are by GfK at the request of Centrum voor Informatie over de Media (CIM).
- In Bosnia and Herzegovina, Mareco Index Bosnia is the provider of TAM ratings (TV meters and diaries).
- In Brazil, IBOPE provides measurement services for TV.
- The provider of Bulgarian TAM ratings is Taylor Nelson Sofres TV PLAN with TV meters.
- In Canada, Numeris measures TV and radio; its subsidiary, NLogic, is one of several companies that provide software for analyzing data.
- In Colombia, television measurement is done by IBOPE and Nielsen. Radio measurement is by ECAR.
- Finnpanel measures radio and TV in Finland.
- In the Czech Republic, television ratings are collected by Mediaresearch.
- In Denmark, radio measurement is by TNS Gallup.
- In France, radio and television measurement is by Médiamétrie; newspaper readership is by EPIQ.
- In Germany, TV audience measurement is by GfK.
- In Greece television measurement is by AGB Hellas (Nielsen Audience Measurement).
- In Hungary television measurement is by Nielsen Közönségmérés Kft (Nielsen Audience Measurement).
- In India, television ratings are collected by the Broadcast Audience Research Council. IRS (Indian Readership Survey) is the industry currency for newspaper and magazine readership.
- In Israel, MBER provides radio and TV measurements.
- In Italy, TV measurement has been by Auditel since November 1986.
- In Japan, Video Research handles radio and television measurement.
- In Kazakhstan, TV measurement is by TNS.
- In Saudi Arabia, measurement is by GfK at the request of Saudi Media Measurement Company (SMMC).
- In Lithuania, TV and radio measurements are by TNS Gallup.
- In Malaysia, two companies provide data using different methodologies: GfK Malaysia and Kantar Media. Radio surveys are by GfK Malaysia.
- In the Netherlands press, TV and radio measurements are by GfK.
- In New Zealand, GfK measures radio audiences and ACB McNair measures TV audiences.
- In the Philippines, TV measurement is by Kantar Media Philippines and AGB Nielsen Philippines. Kantar has a nationwide panel of 2,609 urban and rural homes that represent the Philippine TV-viewing population; AGB Nielsen reportedly has 1,980 homes in urban areas that represent 57 percent of the viewing population. Kantar Media covers 15.135 million households (75 million people); AGB covers 7.26 million households, or 34.4 million people. Radio measurement is by AGB Nielsen, Kantar Media Philippines (at the request of the Kapisanan ng mga Brodkaster ng Pilipinas (KBP, Association of Broadcasters of the Philippines) and Radio Research Council), and the Philippine Survey and Research Center (PSRC). Print measurement is by AGB Nielsen, TNS, and Strategic Consumer and Media Incorporated (SCMI).
- In Pakistan, TV-audience measurement is by Gallup BRB & Medialogic Pakistan.
- In Portugal, TV-audience measurement is by GfK.
- In Poland, TV-audience measurement is by Nielsen Audience Measurement. Internet audience measurement is by Gemius.
- In Russia TV, radio, press, and Internet measurements are by TNS Gallup. Out-of-home advertising is by ESPAR Analytics in cooperation with TNS Gallup, and digital signage is measured by gocount.net.
- In Singapore, measurement is by GfK at the request of Infocomm Media Development Authority (IMDA).
- In Slovakia, TV-audience measurement is by TNS.
- In South Korea, television measurement is by AGB Nielsen (formerly Media Service Korea) and TNmS Media (formerly TNS Korea). AGB Nielsen also handles Internet content measurement with the help of CJ E&M Smart Media Division.
- In Spain, digital-signage audience measurement is by aiTech. Radio and television measurements are by Infortecnica.
- In South Africa, TNS collects radio survey data and Nielsen Media collects data for television audiences.
- In Sweden, TV-audience measurement is by MMS (Mediamätning i Skandinavien).
- In Turkey, TV measurement is by TNS (Kantar Media) and radio by Nielsen.
- In the UK, television measurement is administered by the Broadcasters' Audience Research Board via a metered panel and radio by RAJAR with a diary system. The NRS (National Readership Survey) measures newspaper and magazine readership.
- In the United States, TV and radio measurement is by Nielsen Media Research (the radio component was formerly by Arbitron), and digital signage by TruMedia and CognoVision. Stratacache uses audience-measurement technology to build reports for digital signage.
- In United Arab Emirates (UAE) radio audience measurement is by IPSOS with a sample size of around 2800.
- In Vietnam, TV measurement is by VIETNAM-TAM (MIC, Nielsen and AMI) and Kantar Media.

== See also ==
- Internet radio audience measurement
- List of most-watched television broadcasts
- List of advertising technology companies
