= Corollary, Inc. =

American computer hardware company

- Founded: 1985
- Founders: George White; Alan Slipson
- Defunct: 1997
- Fate: Acquired by Intel Corporation
- Website: corollary.com at the Wayback Machine (archived 1997-10-18)

Corollary, Inc. was an American computer hardware company.

== History ==
The company was founded in 1985 by two former executives of Texas Instruments, with the goal of bringing symmetrical multiprocessing (SMP) to machines based on the Intel x86.

Corollary was the first company to release an IBM PC-Compatible SMP computer in collaboration with Zenith Data Systems, the Z-1000. The multiprocessing technology developed for the Z-1000 was later licensed to OEM companies like Compaq, Zenith and Mitac, which resulted in products such as the Compaq SystemPro.

In 1993, Corollary was set to release an iteration on their previous SMP design, the C-Bus II, based on the Intel Pentium processor.

In 1997, the company was acquired by Intel Corporation as a wholly-owned subsidiary. At the time, Corollary was working on the Profusion technology, which would have provided eight-way multiprocessing. In February 1999, half of the staff working on the project was laid off, which delayed the project indefinitely.

== See also ==
- List of mergers and acquisitions by Intel
