= Retail Intelligence =

Retail Intelligence is the set of tools and applications focused on the creation and management of knowledge through the recollection, processing, interaction and analysis of information generated in all operations performed by any retailer.

Retail Intelligence applications can relate in real-time and interactively, the internal variables (range, space, pricing, promotions, staff, sales) with the external variables (influence zone and its commercial mix), with different parameters of the shopper's behavior, such as pedestrian flows and magnitudes, length of stay, occupancy, hot spots, etc.

These applications provide users with a greater understanding of the current functioning of the points of sale and the buyer behaviour (shopper), to anticipate future events, with the aim of improving the competitive position of its portfolio of stores increasing profitability, efficiency commercial and customer service, and identify new business opportunities.

== Operation ==
Retail Intelligence tools combine the technology hardware (readers of traffic, people counters, motion sensors) with management software used for data access tools and provide reports, analysis, views and alerts to users.

== Tools ==
Retail Intelligence includes the following tools:

- External Traffic reader: sensor that allows external counting.
- In&Out traffic counter: sensors that count in&out traffic at points of sale, allowing to separate the inputs and outputs as well as gauging and measuring the average time of stay.
- Motion sensors: sensors that enable the flow behavior of customers, distinguishing the hottest areas from the least visited at each point of sale.

Access to information is done interactively, via intranet and through tiered access, providing reporting, analysis, views and alerts to users.
