= Cupra Raval =

Electric supermini car

Overview
- Manufacturer: SEAT
- Production: June 2026 – present
- Assembly: Spain: Martorell
- Designer: Alberto Torrecillas

Body and chassis
- Class: Supermini (B-segment)
- Body style: 5-door hatchback
- Layout: Front-motor, front-wheel-drive
- Platform: MEB+
- Related: Volkswagen ID. Polo; Škoda Epiq

Powertrain
- Electric motor: APP290 permanent magnet brushless motor
- Power output: Maximum 166 kW (226 PS; 223 hp)

Dimensions
- Wheelbase: 2,600 mm (102.4 in)
- Length: 4,046 mm (159.3 in)
- Width: 1,784 mm (70.2 in)
- Height: 1,518 mm (59.8 in)

The Cupra Raval (stylized in all caps as ЯAVAL) is a battery electric supermini car that is produced by the Spanish manufacturer SEAT under the Cupra brand since 2026.

== Development ==
The Cupra Raval was first unveiled as the Cupra UrbanRebel concept car on 1 September 2021 at the International Motor Show Germany.

=== UrbanRebel Concept Car ===
The UrbanRebel is based on the MEB Platform, which is designed for electric vehicles of the Volkswagen Group. The concept car has a rear diffuser integrating the shield, and a huge rectangular spoiler which incorporates the light signature in its lower part with an LED strip including the Cupra logo illuminated in the center.

The UrbanRebel is fitted with a continuous 250 kW (340 hp) electric motor, with a boost function to 320 kW (435 hp).

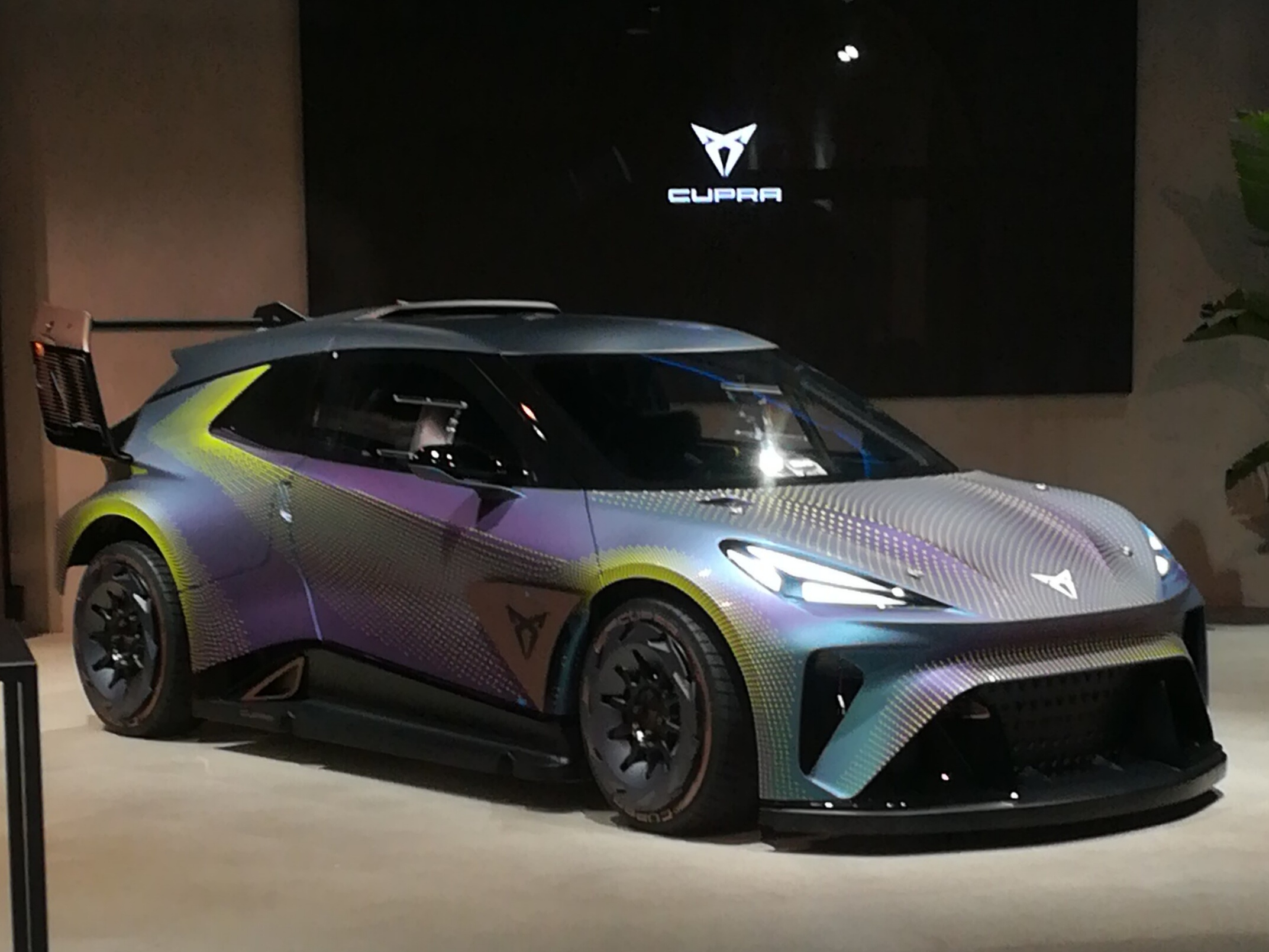
Cupra UrbanRebel Concept

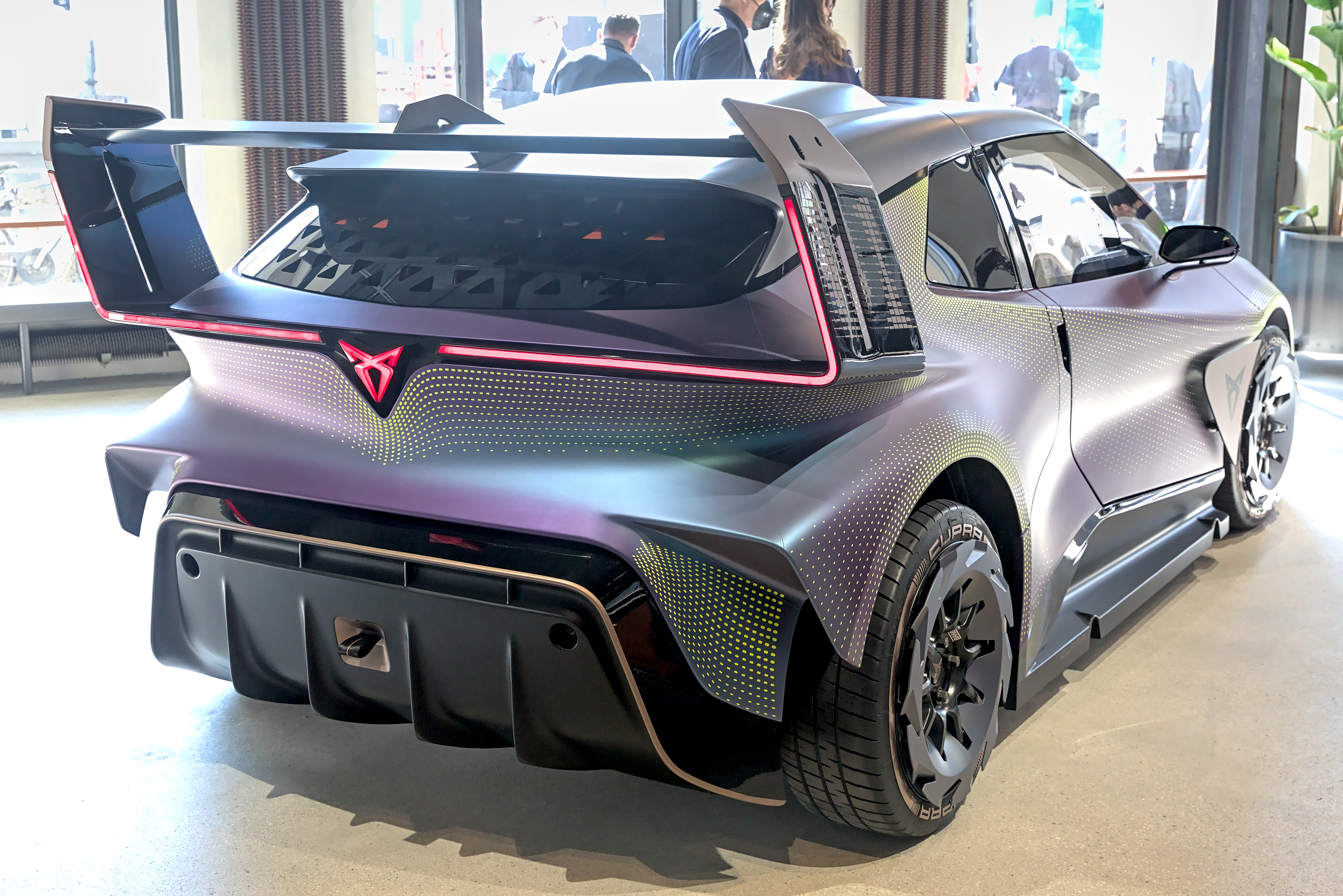
Rear view

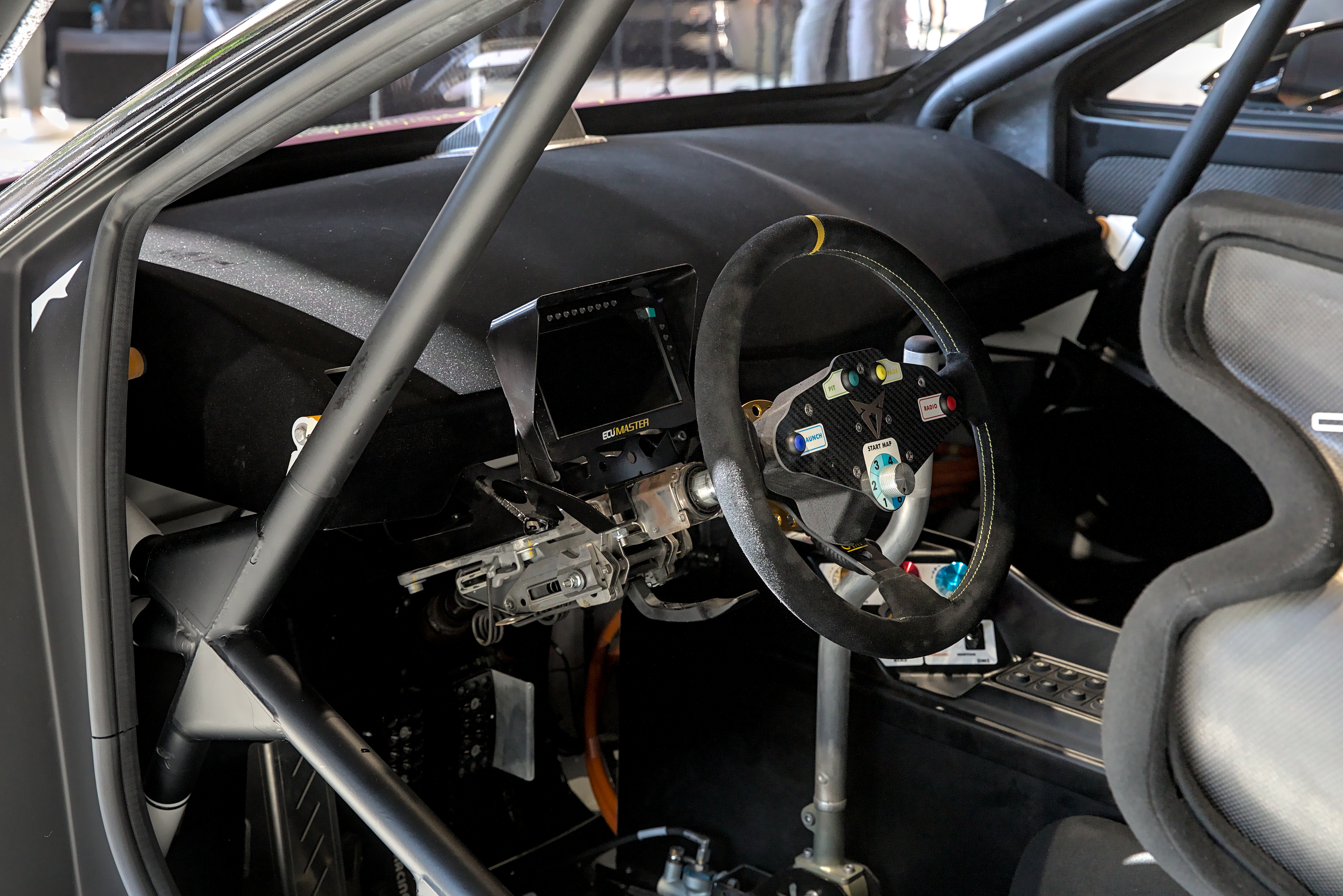
Interior

=== Cupra Raval Concept Car ===
A second concept, close to the production version, was presented as the Cupra UrbanRebel concept car on 1 September 2021 at the International Motor Show Germany. Later, in May 2023, Cupra announced that the production name for the UrbanRebel concept would be the Cupra Raval.

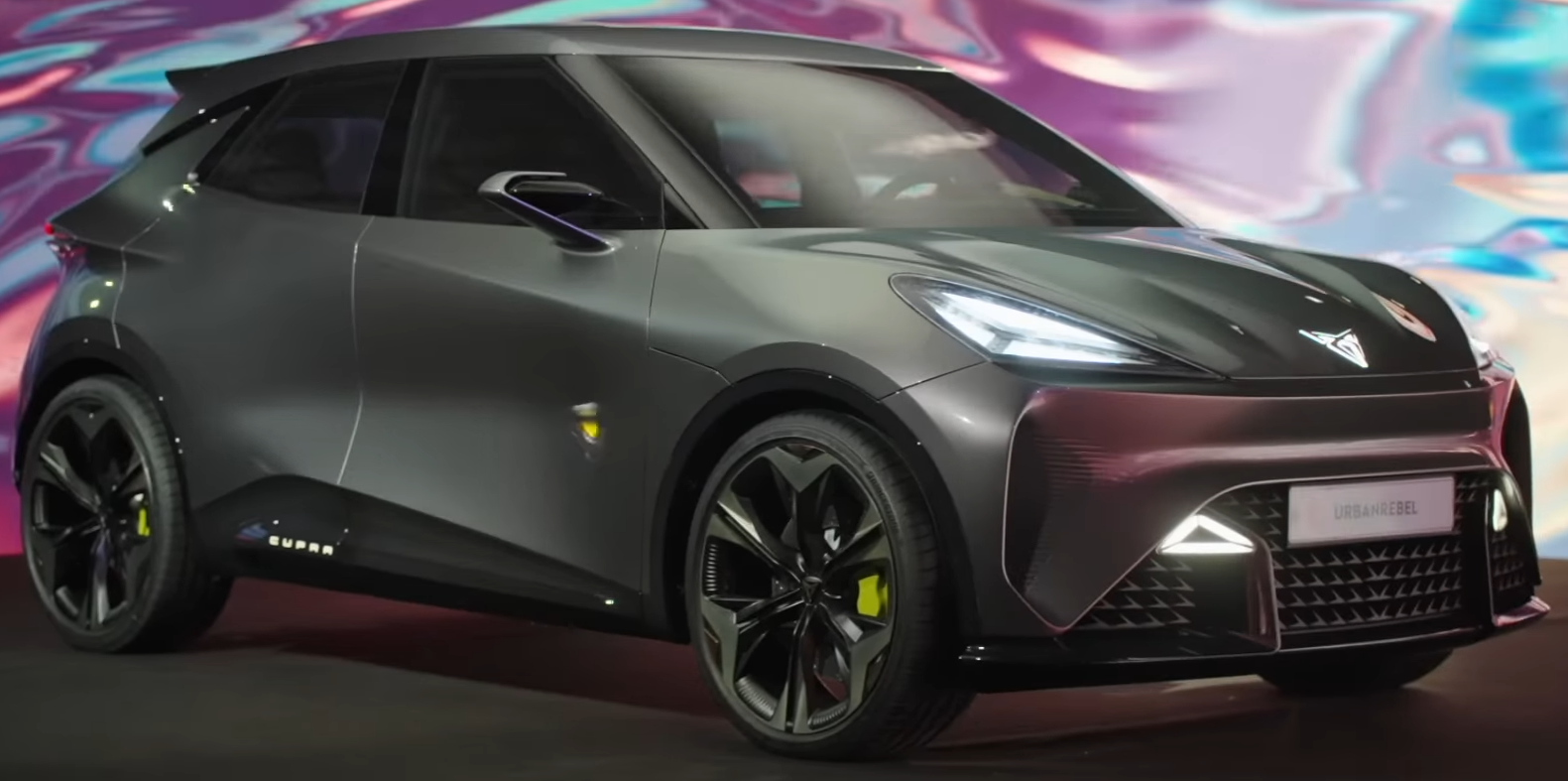
2021 Cupra UrbanRebel Concept

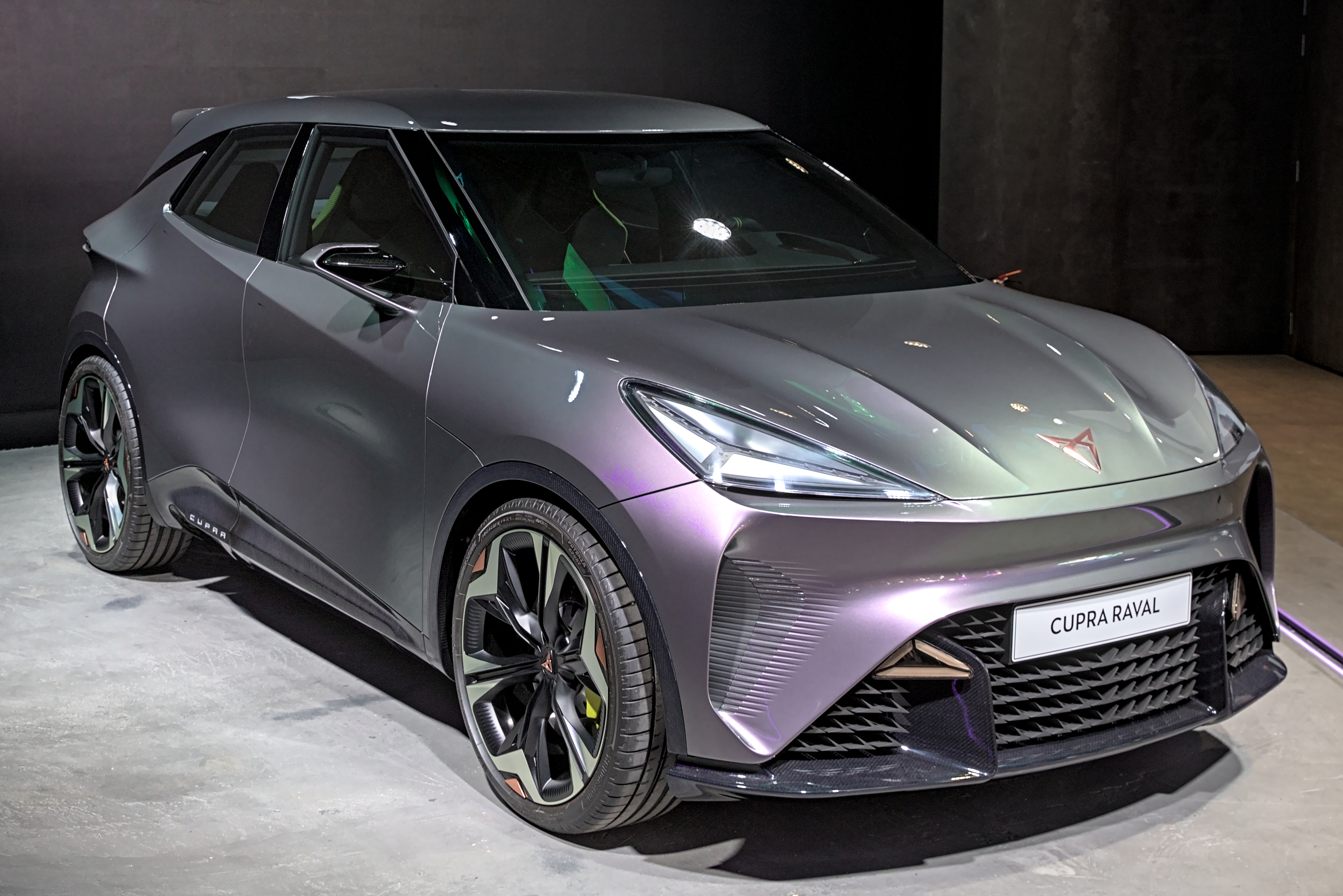
2023 Cupra Raval Concept

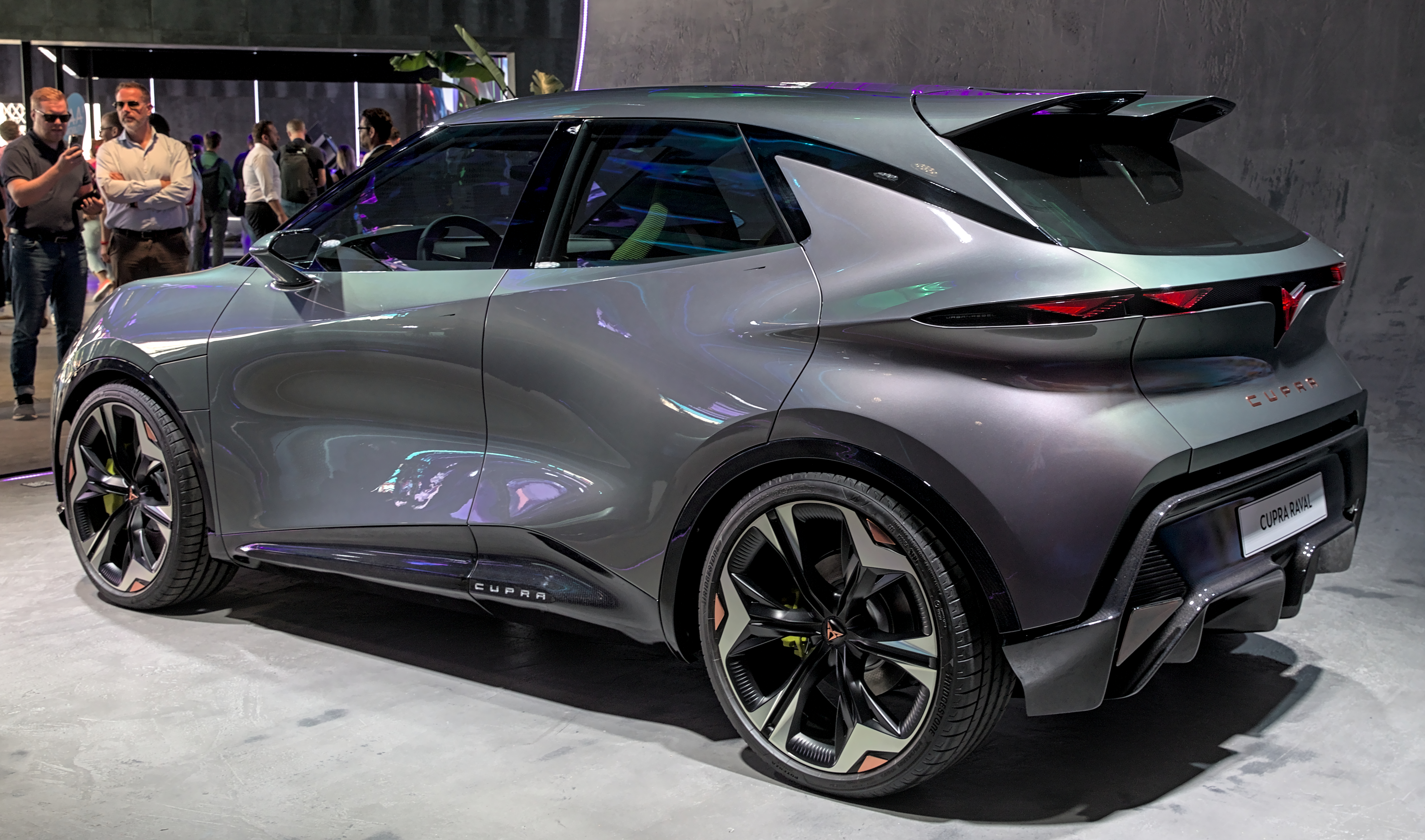
Rear view

=== Production model ===
The production version of the Cupra Raval is based on the MEB+ platform shared with the Škoda Epiq and Volkswagen ID. Polo, with a front-wheel-drive layout. The Raval was revealed in camouflage as a near-production model at the 2025 International Motor Show Germany in Munich, Germany, followed by the launch on 9 April 2026.

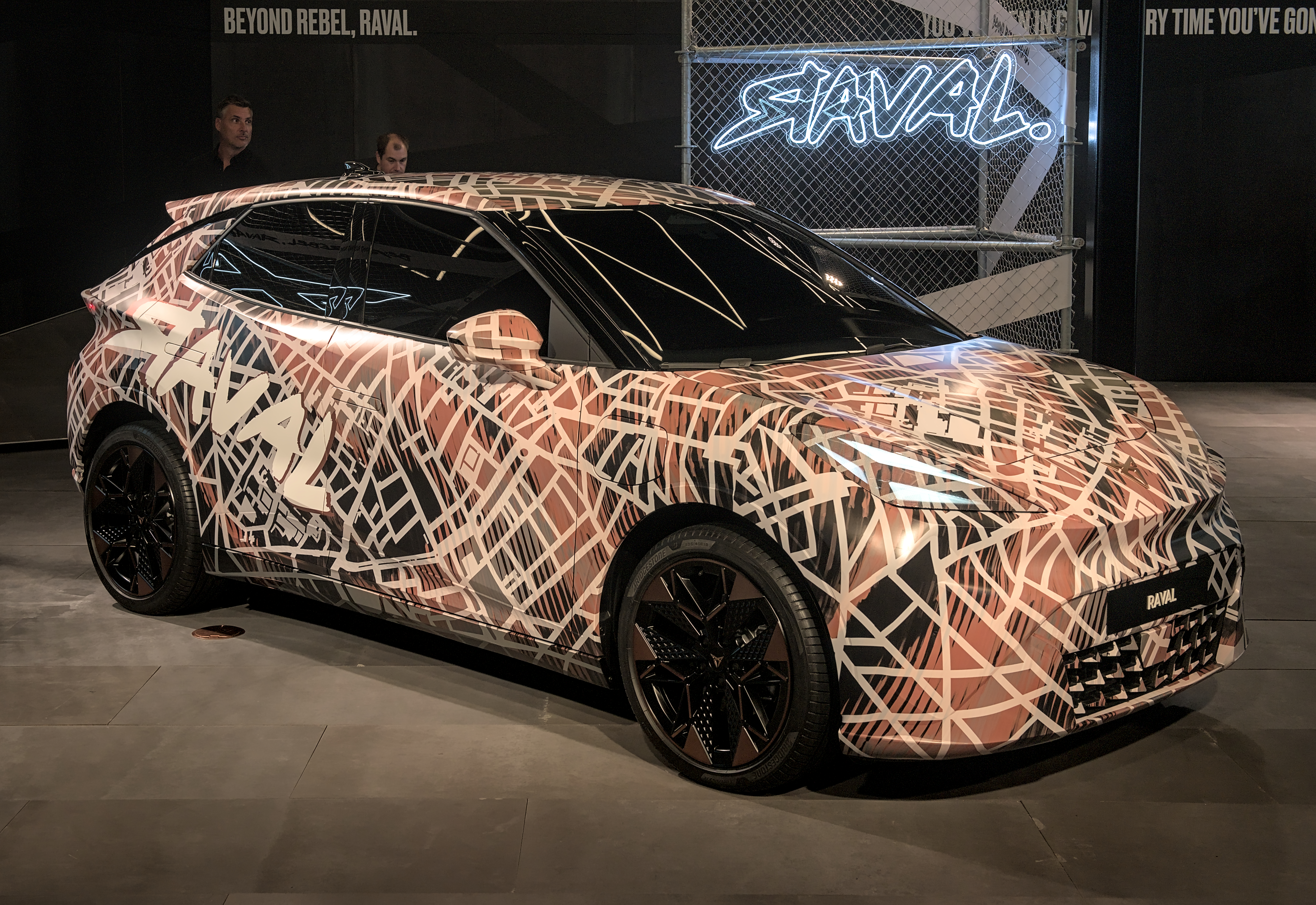
Cupra Raval Prototype

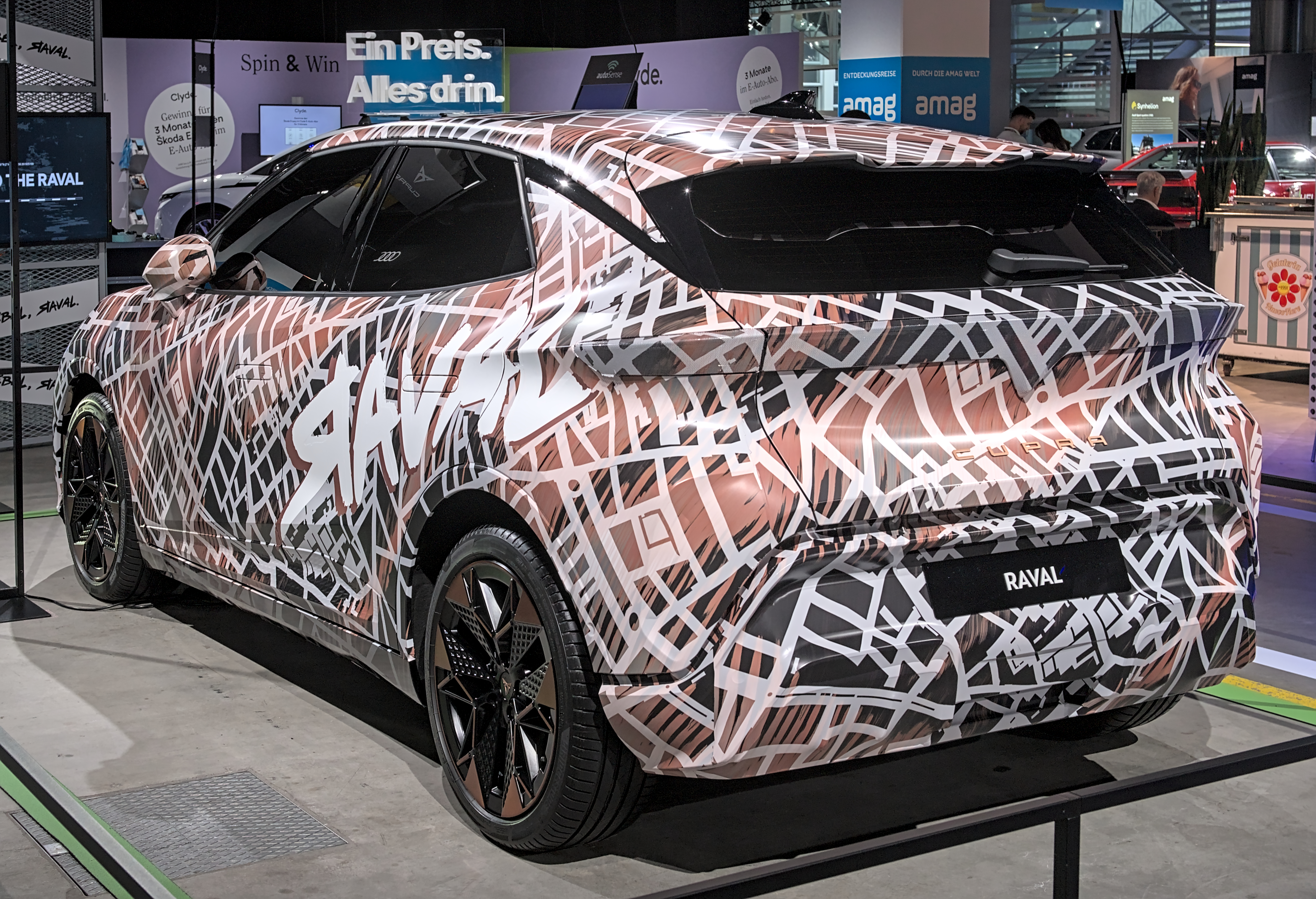
Rear view

== Overview ==
The production version of the Cupra Raval was fully revealed on 9 April 2026. The name of the car comes from the word "rebel" and the El Raval neighbourhood in Barcelona. It is designed and developed in Barcelona, and production is planned in Martorell, Spain. It is also the first vehicle from the Volkswagen Group to be based on the updated MEB+ platform, followed by the Škoda Epiq and Volkswagen ID. Polo.

The Raval features many design elements adapted from the various concept models preceding it, including triangular geometries around the vehicle and most prominently in the daytime running light signature. It offers up to 19-inch wheels on top trims.

Its interior features a 12.9-inch central infotainment display and a 10.25-inch digital instrument cluster, both operated by an Android-based operating system. Upholstery in either recycled fabrics, Dinamica suede or vegan leather are available. It has a 430 L (15 cu ft) trunk.

Rear view]

Interior]

== Specifications ==
Compared to the closely related Volkswagen ID. Polo, it features a "sports chassis" with a 15 mm (0.59 in) lower ride height and adjusted suspension.

The Raval offers two batteries shared by other vehicles using the MEB+ platform including a 37 kWh LFP and a 52 kWh NMC pack, providing a claimed WLTP range of 450 km (280 mi). Top trims use a single motor configuration producing a total of 166 kW (226 PS; 223 hp), accelerating from 0–100 km/h (0–62 mph) in 6.8 seconds. It can charge at up to 105 kW, recharging from 10% to 80% in 24 minutes.

== Safety ==
Euro NCAP test results Cupra Raval (2026)
Test	Score
Overall:	4 /5 stars
Safe driving	58%
Crash avoidance	66%
Crash protection	91%
Post crash	95%

Euro NCAP test results Cupra Raval (safety pack) (2026)
Test	Score
Overall:	5 /5 stars
Safe driving	72%
Crash avoidance	77%
Crash protection	91%
Post crash	95%
