= Étude de la presse d'information quotidienne =

French market research company

- Trade name: EPIQ
- Industry: Audience measurement
- Founded: 1993
- Headquarters: France

Étude de la presse d'information quotidienne (EPIQ, literally "Study of daily press information") is a French audience measurement organisation which gathers readership statistics on behalf of French newspapers. It was formed in 1993 by a group of French newspaper syndicates:

- Presse quotidienne régionale ("Daily regional press")
- Presse quotidienne nationale ("Daily national press")
- Presse quotidienne urbaine gratuite ("Daily metropolitan free press")
- Presse hebdomadaire régionale ("Weekly regional press")

It conducts its research using computer-assisted telephone interviewing (CATI), for both daily and weekly newspapers. Research is conducted on its behalf by other market research organisations, notably TNS Sofres.
