= Škoda Epiq =

Battery electric subcompact crossover SUV

Overview
- Manufacturer: Škoda
- Production: June 2026 – present
- Assembly: Spain: Pamplona

Body and chassis
- Class: Subcompact SUV
- Body style: 5-door crossover SUV
- Layout: Front-engine, front-wheel-drive
- Platform: Volkswagen Group MEB+
- Related: Cupra Raval; Volkswagen ID. Polo; Volkswagen ID. Cross

Powertrain
- Electric motor: APP290 permanent magnet synchronous motor
- Power output: 85 kW (115.6 PS; 114.0 hp) (35); 99 kW (134.6 PS; 132.8 hp) (40); 155 kW (210.7 PS; 207.9 hp) (55)
- Battery: 37 kWh LFP (35 and 40); 51.7 kWh NMC (55)

Dimensions
- Wheelbase: 2,601 mm (102 in)
- Length: 4,171 mm (164 in)
- Width: 1,798 mm (71 in)
- Height: 1,581 mm (62 in)

The Škoda Epiq is a battery-electric subcompact crossover SUV produced by Škoda Auto since June 2026. Built in Pamplona, Spain, it is the brand’s smallest electric SUV. All versions have a front-mounted electric motor and front-wheel drive. It uses the Volkswagen Group’s MEB+ platform and shares its underpinnings with models such as the Volkswagen ID. Polo and Cupra Raval.

== Overview ==
Škoda announced the Epiq and revealed a design study on 15 March 2024. It presented the Epiq show car in Munich on 7 September 2025, before the opening of the IAA motor show. The production version was presented in Zurich on 19 May 2026.

Production started at Volkswagen’s Navarra factory in Pamplona in June 2026. The Epiq was the first Škoda to be built in Spain, where it shares the factory with the Volkswagen ID. Cross.

Škoda introduced the Sportline trim in October 2026, offering it with the Epiq 40 and Epiq 55 powertrains. Its features include black exterior detailing, 19-inch alloy wheels and sports seats.

=== Design ===
The design of the Epiq was influenced by the Vision 7S concept that was shown in 2022. It uses the Modern Solid design language introduced by the Elroq. The lower grille has 8 slots, there are door-mounted side mirrors and the headlights are T-shaped. Slimmer air ducts are used for better cooling.

Rear View

Interior

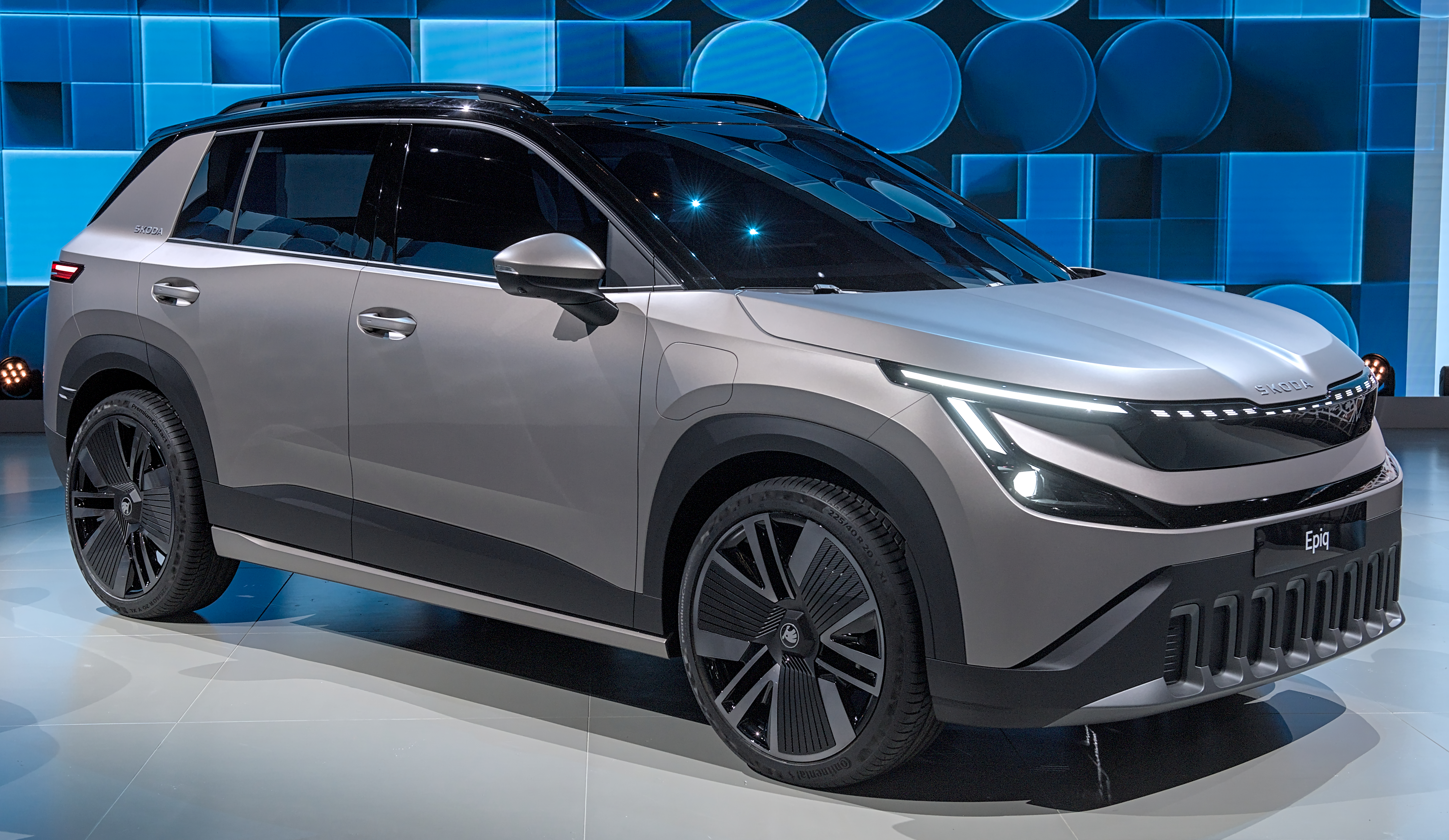
Prototype

== Powertrain and chassis ==
The Epiq has a front-mounted APP290 permanent-magnet synchronous motor driving the front wheels. Three powertrain versions are offered, with two battery capacities.

Version	Maximum power	Battery chemistry	Gross battery capacity
Epiq 35	85 kW (116 PS; 114 hp)	Lithium iron phosphate (LFP)	38.5 kWh
Epiq 40	99 kW (135 PS; 133 hp)	Lithium iron phosphate (LFP)	38.5 kWh
Epiq 55	155 kW (211 PS; 208 hp)	Nickel manganese cobalt (NMC)	55 kWh

The Epiq uses MacPherson strut front suspension and a torsion-beam rear axle. All four wheels have disc brakes, with ventilated discs at the front.

== Safety and driver assistance ==
The Epiq comes with Front Assist, Lane Assist and Side Assist as standard. Side Assist also provides rear cross-traffic alerts and warns occupants of approaching traffic when opening a door. An interior camera monitors the driver’s eye movements for signs of fatigue and inattention.

Optional Travel Assist 3.0 combines adaptive cruise control and lane guidance with traffic-jam and emergency assistance. It uses online traffic data to adjust speed and can bring the vehicle to a stop at red traffic lights. Crossroad Assist uses radar sensors in the front bumper to detect vehicles or people approaching from the sides.
