= EASIC =

Semiconductor Company

eASIC
- Type: Subsidiary
- Industry: Integrated Circuits
- Founded: 1999
- Headquarters: Santa Clara, CA, United States
- Key people: Ronnie Vashista, CEO
- Products: easicopy ASIC Migration, eASIC Nextreme 90nm NEW ASICs, eASIC Nextreme-2 45nm NEW ASICs, eASIC Nextreme-3 28nm, IP Cores, Tools
- Revenue: Confidential
- Parent: Intel
- Website: www.easic.com

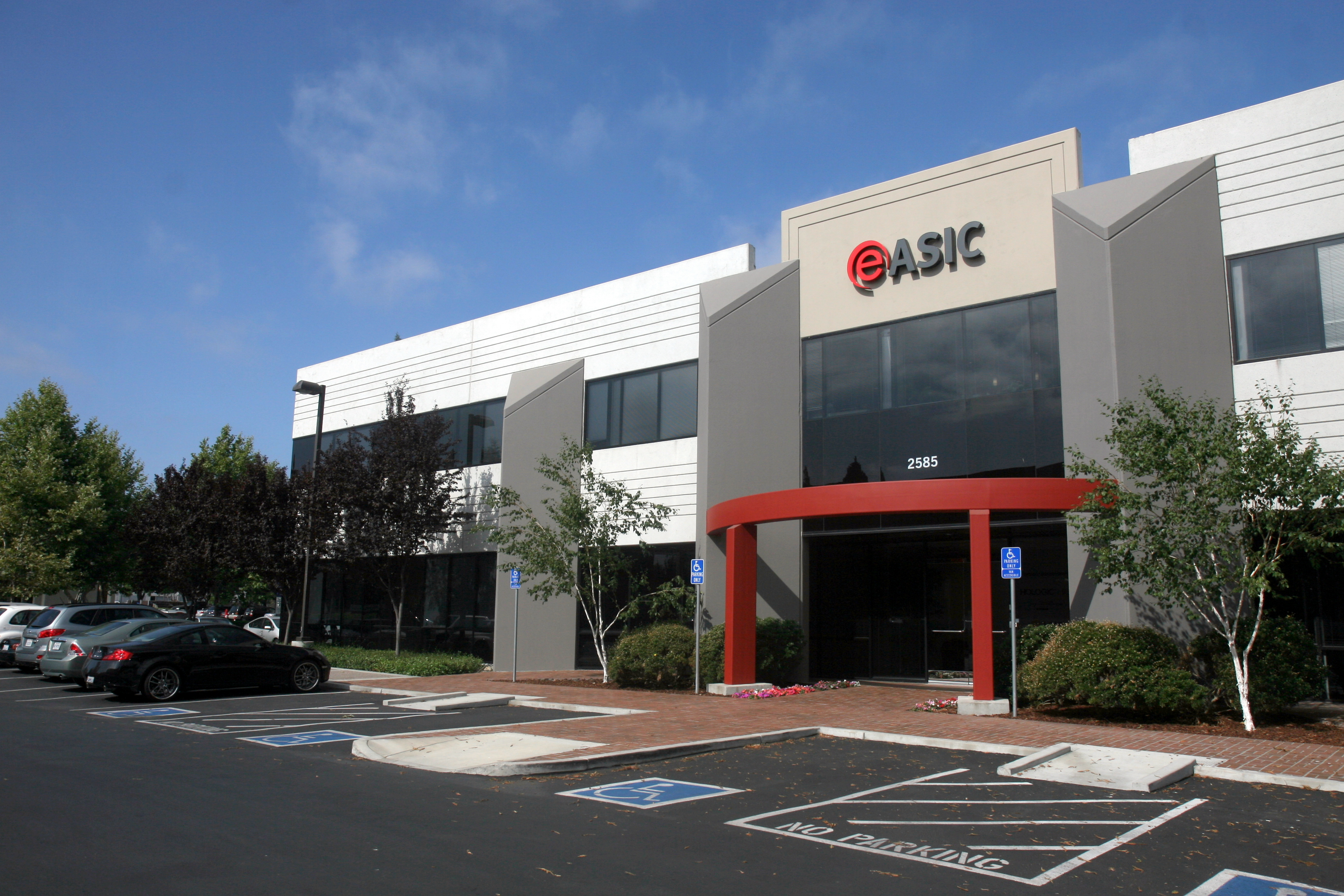
eASIC's former headquarters in Santa Clara

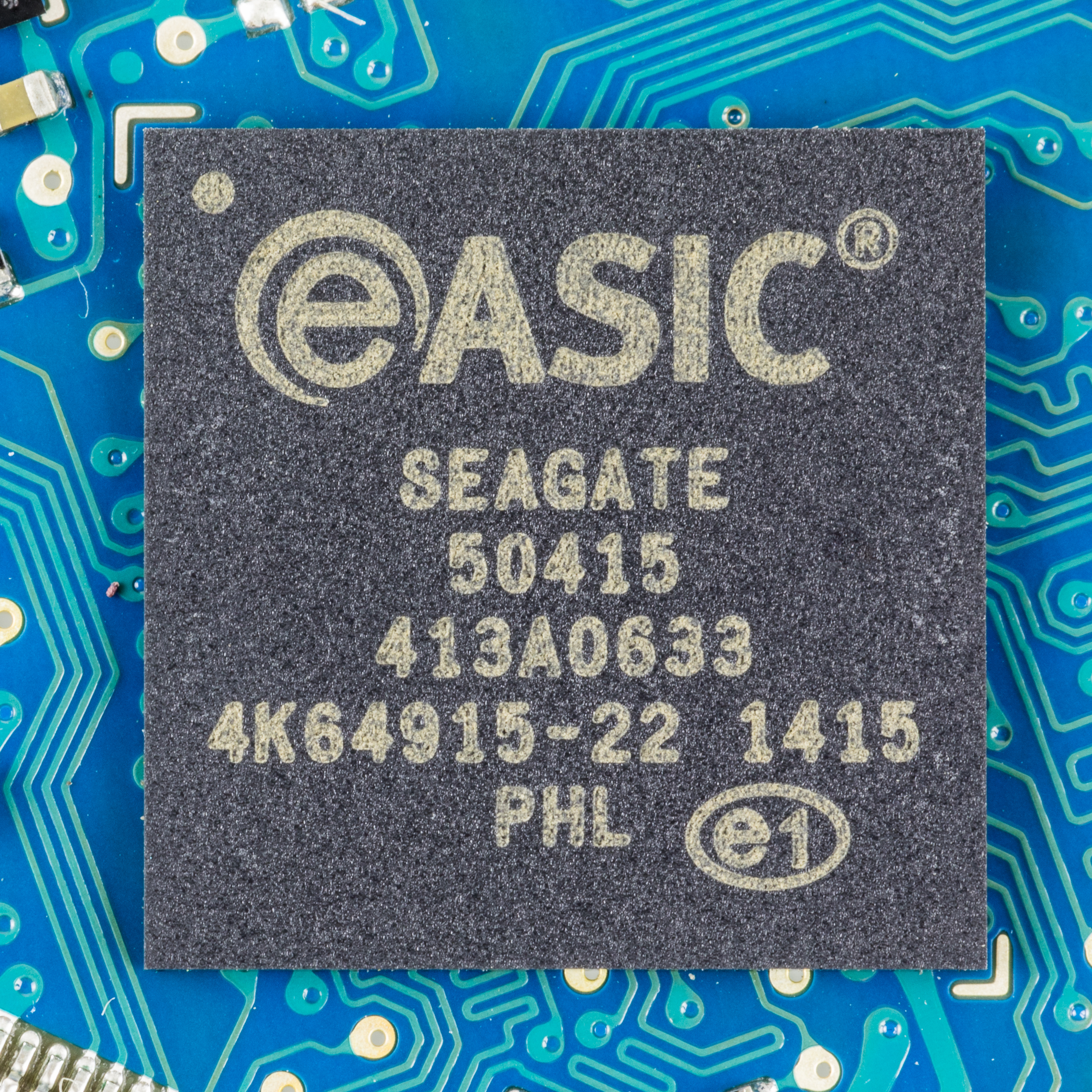
eASIC controller on a Seagate hard disk

eASIC Corporation was a fabless semiconductor company that offered new ASIC devices used in the production of customized silicon devices. It was acquired by Intel in 2018.

== History ==
eASIC Corporation was founded in 1999 in San Jose, California, and incorporated in Delaware by Zvi Or-Bach, the founder of Chip Express (renamed to ChipX). eASIC was a privately held company, headquartered in Santa Clara, California with engineering and R&D teams in Romania, Russia and Malaysia, until they were acquired by Intel, which was announced on July 12, 2018.
