= Electronic circuit design =

Analysis and synthesis of electronic circuits

Electronic circuit design comprises the analysis and synthesis of electronic circuits.

== Methods ==
To design any electrical circuit, either analog or digital, electrical engineers need to be able to predict the voltages and currents at all places within the circuit. Linear circuits, that is, circuits wherein the outputs are linearly dependent on the inputs, can be analyzed by hand using complex analysis. Simple nonlinear circuits can also be analyzed in this way. Specialized software has been created to analyze circuits that are either too complicated or too nonlinear to analyze by hand.

Circuit simulation software allows engineers to design circuits more efficiently, reducing the time cost and risk of error involved in building circuit prototypes. Some of these make use of hardware description languages such as VHDL or Verilog.

=== Network simulation software ===
More complex circuits are analyzed with circuit simulation software such as SPICE and EMTP.

==== Linearization around operating point ====
When faced with a new circuit, the software first tries to find a steady state solution wherein all the nodes conform to Kirchhoff's current law and the voltages across and through each element of the circuit conform to the voltage/current equations governing that element.

Once the steady state solution is found, the software can analyze the response to perturbations using piecewise approximation, harmonic balance or other methods.

==== Piece-wise linear approximation ====
Software such as the PLECS interface to Simulink uses piecewise linear approximation of the equations governing the elements of a circuit. The circuit is treated as a completely linear network of ideal diodes. Every time a diode switches from on to off or vice versa, the configuration of the linear network changes. Adding more detail to the approximation of equations increases the accuracy of the simulation, but also increases its running time.

=== Synthesis ===
Simple circuits may be designed by connecting a number of elements or functional blocks such as integrated circuits.

More complex digital circuits are typically designed with the aid of computer software. Logic circuits (and sometimes mixed mode circuits) are often described in such hardware description languages as HDL, VHDL or Verilog, then synthesized using a logic synthesis engine.

== See also ==
- Circuit design
- Integrated circuit design
