= Ricursive =

Artificial intelligence company

Ricursive, or Ricursive Intelligence, is company founded in September 2025. The core mission of the company is using AI to design silicon chips. It is a spin-out from Google Brain, with founders Anna Goldie and Azalia Mirhoseini.

== Company overview ==
The goal of the company is to speed the transition from idea to working silicon. Their long term goals are divided into three phases:

- Phase one will use AI to speed and improve chip design, primarily physical design and verification.
- Phase two will go from workload to completed chips
- Phase three will be to co-design of workload and chips, specifically to enable fast iteration.

Although the company has stated "We are definitely not an EDA company", in phase one they are taking on precisely the tasks typically performed by these companies. Therefore their commercial competitors will include Cadence Design Systems, Synopsys, and Siemens EDA. Academic software for these tasks is combined in the OpenROAD Project.

The phase two goals are paralleled by efforts such as the OpenAI/Broadcom collaboration, intended to speed up chip design by using LLMs to aid in the design of chip architecture.

== Products ==
Initial products include floorplanning, placement, routing, and verification.

=== AlphaChip ===
AlphaChip is a deep reinforcement learning method for automated chip floorplanning. The basic ideas were introduced in a 2021 paper from Google, which describes an approach to macro placement, a stage of chip floorplanning. It is based on reinforcement learning (RL), a machine learning method in which a system iteratively improves its decisions by optimizing performance-based reward signals.

The claims of the seminal AlphaChip paper have engendered considerable controversy.
