= Circuit underutilization =

Not using the area or components of an integrated circuit to full efficiency

Circuit underutilization also chip underutilization, programmable circuit underutilization, gate underutilization, logic block underutilization refers to a physical incomplete utility of semiconductor grade silicon on a standardized mass-produced circuit programmable chip, such as a gate array type ASIC, an FPGA, or a CPLD.

== Gate array ==
In the example of a gate array, which may come in sizes of 5,000 or 10,000 gates, a design which utilizes even 5,001 gates would be required to use a 10,000 gate chip. This inefficiency results in underutilization of the silicon.

== FPGA ==
Due to the design components of field-programmable gate array into logic blocks, simple designs that underutilize a single block suffer from gate underutilization, as do designs that overflow onto multiple blocks, such as designs that use wide gates. Additionally, the very generic architecture of FPGAs lends to high inefficiency; multiplexers occupy silicon real estate for programmable selection, and an abundance of flip-flops to reduce setup and hold times, even if the design does not require them, resulting in 40 times less density than of standard cell ASICs.

== See also ==
- Circuit minimization
- Don't-care condition
