= Logic block =

Reprogrammable computer hardware technology

In computing, a logic block or configurable logic block (CLB) is a fundamental building block of field-programmable gate array (FPGA) technology. Logic blocks can be configured by the engineer to provide reconfigurable logic gates.

Logic blocks are the most common FPGA architecture, and are usually laid out within a logic block array. Logic blocks require I/O pads (to interface with external signals), and routing channels (to interconnect logic blocks).

Programmable logic blocks were invented by David W. Page and LuVerne R. Peterson, and defined within their 1985 patents.

== Applications ==
An application circuit must be mapped into an FPGA with adequate resources. While the number of logic blocks and I/Os required is easily determined from the design, the number of routing tracks needed may vary considerably even among designs with the same amount of logic.

For example, a crossbar switch requires much more routing than a systolic array with the same gate count. Since unused routing tracks increase the cost (and decrease the performance) of the part without providing any benefit, FPGA manufacturers try to provide just enough tracks so that most designs that will fit in terms of lookup tables (LUTs) and I/Os can be routed. This is determined by estimates such as those derived from Rent's rule or by experiments with existing designs.

FPGAs are also widely used for systems validation including pre-silicon validation, post-silicon validation, and firmware development. This allows chip companies to validate their design before the chip is produced in the factory, reducing the time-to-market.

== Architecture ==
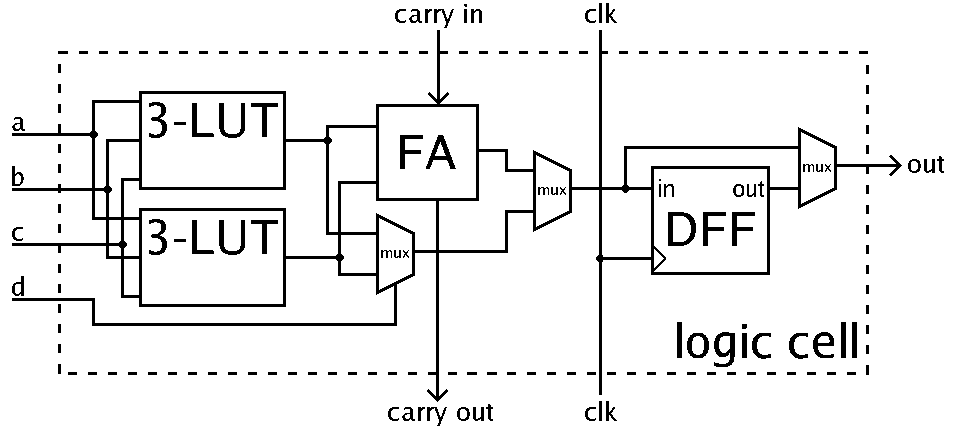
Simplified illustration of a logic cell

In general, a logic block consists of a few logic cells (each cell is called an adaptive logic module (ALM), a logic element (LE), slice, etc.). A typical cell consists of a 4-input LUT, a full adder (FA), and a D-type flip-flop (DFF), as shown to the right. The LUTs are in this figure split into two 3-input LUTs. In normal mode those are combined into a 4-input LUT through the left mux. In arithmetic mode, their outputs are fed to the FA. The selection of mode is programmed into the middle multiplexer. The output can be either synchronous or asynchronous, depending on the programming of the mux to the right, in the figure example. In practice, entire or parts of the FA are put as functions into the LUTs in order to save space.

Logic blocks typically contain a few ALMs/LEs/slices. ALMs and slices usually contain 2 or 4 structures similar to the example figure, with some shared signals.

Manufacturers have started moving to 6-input LUTs in their high performance parts, claiming increased performance.

=== 3D architecture ===
To shrink the size and power consumption of FPGAs, vendors such as Tabula and Xilinx have introduced new 3D or stacked architectures. Following the introduction of its 28 nm 7-series FPGAs, Xilinx revealed that several of the highest-density parts in those FPGA product lines will be constructed using multiple dies in one package, employing technology developed for 3D construction and stacked-die assemblies. The technology stacks several (three or four) active FPGA dice side-by-side on a silicon interposer – a single piece of silicon that carries passive interconnect. The multi-die construction also allows different parts of the FPGA to be created with different process technologies, as the process requirements are different between the FPGA fabric itself and the very high speed 28 Gbit/s serial transceivers. An FPGA built in this way is called a heterogeneous FPGA.

== External I/O ==
Logic block pin locations

Since clock signals (and often other high-fan-out signals) are normally routed via special-purpose dedicated routing networks (i.e. global buffers) in commercial FPGAs, they and other signals are separately managed.

For this example architecture, the locations of the FPGA logic block pins are shown to the right.

Each input is accessible from one side of the logic block, while the output pin can connect to routing wires in both the channel to the right and the channel below the logic block.

Each logic block output pin can connect to any of the wiring segments in the channels adjacent to it.

Similarly, an I/O pad can connect to any one of the wiring segments in the channel adjacent to it. For example, an I/O pad at the top of the chip can connect to any of the W wires (where W is the channel width) in the horizontal channel immediately below it.

== Routing ==
Generally, the FPGA routing is unsegmented. That is, each wiring segment spans only one logic block before it terminates in a switch box. By turning on some of the programmable switches within a switch box, longer paths can be constructed. For higher speed interconnect, some FPGA architectures use longer routing lines that span multiple logic blocks.

Switch box topology

Whenever a vertical and a horizontal channel intersect, there is a switch box. In this architecture, when a wire enters a switch box, there are three programmable switches that allow it to connect to three other wires in adjacent channel segments. The pattern, or topology, of switches used in this architecture is the planar or domain-based switch box topology. In this switch box topology, a wire in track number one connects only to wires in track number one in adjacent channel segments, wires in track number 2 connect only to other wires in track number 2 and so on. The figure on the right illustrates the connections in a switch box.

Generally, all the routing channels have the same width (number of wires). Multiple I/O pads may fit into the height of one row or the width of one column in the array.

== Hard blocks ==
Modern FPGA families expand upon the above capabilities to include higher level functionality fixed into the silicon. Having these common functions embedded into the silicon reduces the area required and gives those functions increased speed compared to building them from primitives. Examples of these include multipliers, generic DSP blocks, embedded processors, high speed I/O logic and embedded memories.

Higher-end FPGAs can contain high speed multi-gigabit transceivers and hard IP cores such as processor cores, Ethernet media access controllers, PCI/PCI Express controllers, and external memory controllers. These cores exist alongside the programmable fabric, but they are built out of transistors instead of LUTs so they have ASIC level performance and power consumption while not consuming a significant amount of fabric resources, leaving more of the fabric free for the application-specific logic. The multi-gigabit transceivers also contain high performance analog input and output circuitry along with high-speed serializers and deserializers, components which cannot be built out of LUTs. Higher-level PHY layer functionality such as line coding may or may not be implemented alongside the serializers and deserializers in hard logic, depending on the FPGA.

== Clock signals ==
Most of the circuitry built inside of an FPGA is synchronous circuitry that requires a clock signal. FPGAs contain dedicated global and regional routing networks for clock and reset so they can be delivered with minimal skew. FPGAs generally contain analog phase-locked loop and/or delay-locked loop components to synthesize new clock frequencies and attenuate jitter. Complex designs can use multiple clocks with different frequency and phase relationships, each forming separate clock domains. These clock signals can be generated locally by an oscillator or they can be recovered from a high speed serial data stream. Care must be taken when building clock domain crossing circuitry to avoid metastability. FPGAs generally contain block RAMs that are capable of working as dual port RAMs with different clocks, aiding in the construction of building FIFOs and dual port buffers that connect differing clock domains.

== See also ==
- Altera
