= Steve Teig =

American business executive

- Born: January 1961 (age 65); United States
- Education: Princeton University
- Occupations: Business executive, computer engineer
- Known for: Software and semiconductors inventions

Steve Teig is an American business executive and entrepreneur, who became the chief executive officer of the technology company Perceive before it was acquired by Amazon. He was founder and/or Chief Technology Officer (CTO) of multiple ventures during his career. In 2024, he became the Vice President and Distinguished Engineer at Amazon.

== Early life and education ==
Teig received a B.S.E. degree in electrical engineering and computer science from Princeton University in 1982.

== Career ==
He went on to co-found Simplex in 1998, and the firm was acquired by Cadence Design Systems in 2002. Following the acquisition, he served as the chief scientist of Cadence. In 2003, he left Cadence to co-found Tabula, where he served as the new firm's chief technology officer (CTO). Tabula focused on the design of semiconductors, particularly FPGAs. Tabula shut down on March 24, 2015.

Following the dissolution of Tabula, he became the CTO of Tessera Technologies. Tessera changed its name to Xperi in 2017.

In 2020, Teig became the CEO of the semiconductor company Perceive. The firm focuses on hardware for running machine learning software on mobile devices. Perceive was incubated at Xperi, and Xperi was the majority shareholder in the company. After the company was acquired by Amazon in 2024, Teig became a Vice President and Distinguished Engineer at Amazon.

== Patents ==
Teig holds over 390 patents.
