= DCM =

DCM may refer to:

== Science and technology ==
- Deep cement mixing in marine geotechnical engineering
- Deep chlorophyll maximum, subsurface maximum in the concentration of chlorophyll
- Dichloromethane, a common solvent in organic chemistry
- Dilated cardiomyopathy, a heart condition
- Direction cosine matrix, a three-dimensional rotation formalism
- Docking Cargo Module, A Russian module of the International Space Station
- Dynamic causal modelling, a method for the interpretation of functional neuroimaging data

=== Computing ===
- Digital clock manager, in field-programmable gate arrays
- .dcm, a filename extension for Digital Imaging and Communications in Medicine
- Desired Configuration Management, in Microsoft's System Center Configuration Manager

== Organisations ==
- DCM textiles, formerly Delhi Cloth & General Mills
- DCM Ventures, a venture capital company
- Digital Cinema Media, an advertising company
- NTT DoCoMo (NYSE symbol), a mobile phone operator in Japan
- Doll Capital Management, a US venture capital firm which funded SandForce, BitTorrent and others
- Dunbee-Combex-Marx, a former British toy manufacturer which purchased Lines Bros and Schuco Modell
- DoubleClick Campaign Manager, online ad management and ad serving solution.

== Other uses ==
- IATA code for Castres–Mazamet Airport, an airport in France
- ICAO airline code used by Fltplan.com
- Demand Chain Management
- Deputy Chief of Mission
- Designated Contract Market, regulatory term for a Prediction market
- Director of Civilian Marksmanship, by U.S. Civilian Marksmanship Program
- Debt capital markets in finance
- Distinguished Conduct Medal, British and Commonwealth medal for extreme bravery
