= AlphaChip =

Deep reinforcement learning method

AlphaChip is an automated method for macro placement, a crucial step in chip floorplanning. It is based on reinforcement learning (RL), a machine learning method in which a system iteratively improves its decisions by optimizing performance-based reward signals. AlphaChip was developed at Google Brain, where it was used in the design of their Tensor Processing Units. It was then made open-source and published in a Nature paper in 2021. The ideas behind AlphaChip, and the core developers, form the basis of the spin-out Ricursive.

The claims of the 2021 paper have engendered considerable controversy, primarily over whether AlphaChip is an advance over existing algorithms, and academic integrity.

== Background ==
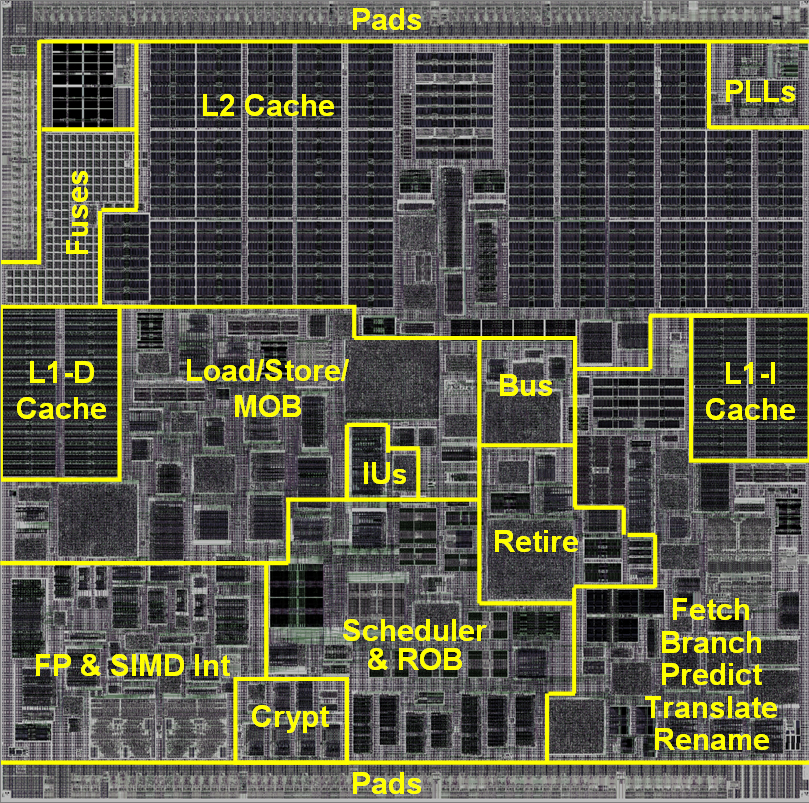
A CPU floorplan with structural blocks indicated by yellow outlines. Within blocks, macros of different sizes and "glue logic" in between can be seen. SRAM memories represent some of the largest macros.

Chip design for modern integrated circuits is a complex, expert-driven process that relies on electronic design automation (EDA). It determines the cost and performance of the final chip, and typically takes weeks or months to complete. Advances that produce better designs, or complete the process faster, are commercially and academically significant.

AlphaChip performs macro placement, which determines where large circuit components (macros) will be laid out on the chip. The number of macros per circuit typically ranges from several to thousands. Like almost all steps in chip design, placement started as a manual process. Since manual placement can be time consuming, many attempts to automate this process have been pursued since the 1970s, using a variety of techniques. AlphaChip is the first to attack the problem using reinforcement learning.

A full evaluation of the quality of a proposed placement is slow. Wiring must be performed after placement, and strongly influences the power, performance, and area (PPA) of the completed chip. A full wiring calculation is too slow to use when investigating changes in placement, so placement tools typically use a proxy cost, a simplified objective function used to guide the placement algorithm during training and evaluation. The faithfulness of the chosen proxy cost to the final objective cost is a critical aspect of placer performance.

== 2021 Nature paper ==
In 2021, Nature published a paper under the title “A graph‑placement methodology for fast chip design” co‑authored by 21 Google-affiliated researchers. The paper reported that an RL agent could generate macro placements for integrated circuits "in under six hours" and achieve improvements over human-designed layouts in power, timing performance, and area (PPA), standard chip-quality metrics referring respectively to energy consumption, chip operating speed, and silicon footprint (evaluated after wire routing). It introduced a sequential macro placement algorithm in which macros are placed one at a time instead of optimizing their locations concurrently. At each step, the algorithm selects a location for a single macro on a discretized chip canvas, conditioning its decision on the placements of previously placed macros. This sequential formulation converts macro placement into a long-horizon decision process in which early placement choices constrain later ones. After macro placement, force-directed placement is applied to place standard cells connected to the macros. Deep reinforcement learning is used to train a policy network to place macros by maximizing a reward that reflects final placement quality (for example, wirelength and congestion). Policy learning occurs during self‑play for one or multiple circuit designs. Further placement optimizations refine the overall layout by balancing wirelength, density, and overlap constraints, while treating the macro locations produced by the RL policy as fixed obstacles. The approach relies on pre-training, in which the RL model is first trained on a corpus of prior designs (twenty in the Nature paper) to learn general placement patterns before being fine-tuned on a specific chip.

Circuit examples used in the study were parts of four proprietary Google TPU designs, called blocks (or floorplan partitions), and one publicly available RISC-V design. The main results from the paper are summarized in Table 1, which is reproduced here, with colors added to indicate which technique achieved the best value for each metric and each design. Green indicates AlphaChip, yellow manual design, and blue RePlAce.

Comparisons against baselines
Name	Method	Timing		Total area (μm²)	Total power (W)	Wirelength (m)	Congestion	
Name	Method	WNS (ps)	TNS (ns)	Total area (μm²)	Total power (W)	Wirelength (m)	H (%)	V (%)
Block 1	RePlAce	374	233.7	1,693,139	3.70	52.14	1.82	0.06
Block 1	Manual	136	47.6	1,680,790	3.74	51.12	0.13	0.03
Block 1	Our method	84	23.3	1,681,767	3.59	51.29	0.34	0.03
Block 2	RePlAce	97	6.6	785,655	3.52	61.07	1.58	0.06
Block 2	Manual	75	98.1	830,470	3.56	62.92	0.23	0.04
Block 2	Our method	59	170	694,757	3.13	59.11	0.45	0.03
Block 3	RePlAce	193	3.9	867,390	1.36	18.84	0.19	0.05
Block 3	Manual	18	0.2	869,779	1.42	20.74	0.22	0.07
Block 3	Our method	11	2.2	868,101	1.38	20.80	0.04	0.04
Block 4	RePlAce	58	11.2	944,211	2.21	27.37	0.03	0.03
Block 4	Manual	58	17.9	947,766	2.17	29.16	0.00	0.01
Block 4	Our method	52	0.7	942,867	2.21	28.50	0.03	0.02
Block 5	RePlAce	156	254.6	1,477,283	3.24	31.83	0.04	0.03
Block 5	Manual	107	97.2	1,480,881	3.23	37.99	0.00	0.01
Block 5	Ours	68	141.0	1,472,302	3.28	36.59	0.01	0.03
Here, we compare our method with the state-of-the-art method (RePlAce) and with manual placements using an industry-standard EDA tool. For all metrics in this table, lower is better. H, horizontal; V, vertical.

The paper described the approach as generalizable across chip designs, though as an RL approach the results will potentially depend on what training data on similar designs is available.

== Controversy ==
The publication of the 2021 Nature paper has lead to a number of public, scholarly, and legal disputes. The primary technical question is whether the new techniques have been adequately proven to be better than existing techniques. Few direct and publicly verifiable comparisons are available, and both internal Google studies and external attempts to replicate the algorithm have failed to show the claimed benefits. This lack of public and explicit comparisons has resulted in skepticism over the paper's claims. In addition, the inability of others to replicate the claimed results have sparked concerns about the paper’s methodology, reproducibility, and scientific integrity. (Note: From: "This situation reflects a broader scientific concern with reproducibility and integrity.")

=== Internal dispute at Google ===
In 2022, Satrajit Chatterjee, a Google engineer involved in reviewing the AlphaChip work, raised concerns internally and drafted an alternative analysis, Stronger Baselines. A leaked copy of this unpublished manuscript argues that established methods outperform the RL approach in a fair comparison. In March 2022, Google declined to publish this analysis and terminated Chatterjee's employment.. Chatterjee filed a wrongful dismissal lawsuit, alleging that representations related to the AlphaChip research involved fraud and scientific misconduct.. Both parties then publicly accused each other of bad faith, personal animosity, and technical errors. In May 2024, Google and Chatterjee reached a settlement.

=== Comparisons to alternative techniques ===
The Nature paper described the reduction in design-process time as going from "days or weeks" to "hours". Critics have complained this comparison is subjective and unscientific, as it did not provide per-design time breakdowns or specify the number of engineers, their level of expertise, or the baseline tools and workflow against which this comparison was made.

Additional criticism noted the claimed six-hour runtime bound per circuit example did not account for pre-training. In the described experiments, RL policies were trained on twenty circuit blocks (requiring 48 hours) and then evaluated on five additional blocks, but the reported 6 hour runtime reflected only the evaluation phase. The evaluation reported in the paper relied on computing resources that were larger than those used by other tools.

==== Comparisons of placement quality ====
Because macro placement is largely geometric and its fundamental algorithms are not tied to a specific process node, competing approaches can be evaluated on public benchmarks (tests) across technologies, rather than primarily on proprietary internal designs. This is standard procedure when comparing academic placers. (Note: Reviewer 2: "The evaluation can be strengthened with comparisons against the academic benchmark suites for placement, such as those from ISPD, ICCAD and DAC, which is de rigeur [sic] standard in the academic community.")

==== Results reported by AlphaChip ====
The initial AlphaChip paper evaluated their method on fewer benchmarks (five) than is common in the field, (Note: Reviewer 2: "The evaluation can be strengthened with comparisons against the academic benchmark suites for placement, such as those from ISPD, ICCAD and DAC, which is de rigeur [sic] standard in the academic community." For example, aPlace reported on 18 benchmarks, ePlace on 11, NTUplace3 on 33, RePlAce on 26, and DreamPlace on 14.) and showed mixed results across different evaluation goals, as shown in the table above. All but one of the examples given were internal proprietary designs, and results were only compared to one academic placer (RePlAce). Timing of the resulting designs was emphasized but the timing-driven option of RePlAce was not used. (Note: Reviewer 3: "(ii) Timing slack and congestion are used to “gray out” three out of five RePlAce results in Table 1. The authors need to describe how these metrics were assessed (i.e., at what point in the commercial toolflow, based on what early/trial or final routing). (iii) Whether the timing-driven capability of RePlAce was used needs to be stated clearly.")

An additional paper also compared directly to only one external placer (DreamPlace), out of many potential competing placers. The examples that were used had few (4 to 7) macro blocks, whereas (for example) a set of 18 modern benchmarks had a range of 51 to 3748 blocks.

As of 2025, neither Google nor the paper's authors have offered any direct comparisons with prior methods on more realistic and modern benchmarks.

==== External attempts to replicate ====
Researchers at the University of California, San Diego (UC San Diego), led by professors Chung-Kuan Cheng and Andrew B. Kahng, have re-implemented the AlphaChip algorithm, working from the description in the paper and the released source code. In 2023, they placed a wide variety of public domain designs using five different placers: their AlphaChip replicate, classic simulated annealing (as described in Stronger Baselines), a leading academic placer (RePlAce), a commercial placer (CMP from Cadence), and human placement. In these results, the AlphaChip algorithm did not outperform existing techniques. AlphaChip raised numerous objections to this comparison, and Kahng et al. in turn replied. (Note: Google objections to 2023 comparison: (a) Pre-training was not used. (b) Used an order of magnitude fewer compute resources. (c) Did not train to convergence. (d) Evaluated on non-representative benchmarks. (e) Reimplemented algorithm rather than using released code. 2025 UCSD replies: (a) Training added according to spec. (b) Additional and sufficient resources (as specified in Nature paper) added. (c) Some cases still don't converge despite doubling iterations allowed. (d) Test cases using older technology removed. (e) Google supplied code is used for final iterations.) After taking the objections into account, they re-did the placements, fully routed them (to avoid any reliance on proxy objectives), and measured the resulting wire length. A portion of their extensive comparisons is shown here; (Note: When multiple AlphaChip variants were tried, only the best result is shown. Results rounded to three digits and orders of magnitude dropped. Best result in bold.) in no cases did the AlphaChip replicate give a shorter wire length than the existing commercial placer.

Routed wire length as determined by results from different placement algorithms
Benchmark	AlphaChip (replicate)	Annealing	Academic	Commercial	Human
Ariane	465	398	513	405	468
Black Parrot	332	289	269	231	259
Mempool	112	115	113	103	108

They conclude that the reinforcement-learning approach described in the Nature publication did not consistently outperform established placement methods and typically required significantly greater computational effort.

Starting in 2022, multiple researchers and commentators called for results on publicly available benchmarks to settle the dispute through independent verification and comparison. No positive independent replications of the Nature results have been reported in peer-reviewed literature in the four years since publication.

As of 2026, none of the commercial companies with competing products have adopted AlphaChip's approach. A 2026 statement by Thomas Andersen, vice president for AI & Machine Learning at Synopsys, states: "In core EDA algorithms, there have been attempts with reinforcement learning to come up with better solutions, but that hasn’t really panned out."

==== Research integrity concerns ====
A 2023 paper states "This situation reflects a broader scientific concern with reproducibility and integrity," when referring to the difficulty of reproducing the results in the paper.

In October 2024, sixteen methodological concerns were grouped into categories and itemized as "initial doubts" in a detailed critique by chip design researcher and former University of Michigan professor Igor L. Markov in Communications of the ACM, from an arXiv preprint in 2023. The critique described multiple questionable research practices in the evaluation of AlphaChip, particularly around selective reporting of benchmarks and outcomes (cherry-picking), selective use of metrics, and selective choice of baselines. As of 2026, this paper was prefaced with an ACM "EXPRESSION OF CONCERN: An investigation is underway regarding the content and transparency of disclosure for this article."

== Nature editorial actions ==
In April 2022, the peer review file for the Nature article was included as a supplementary information file.

In September 2023, Nature added an editor's note to "A graph placement methodology for fast chip design" stating that the paper's performance claims had been called into question and that the editors were investigating the concerns. On 21 September 2023, Andrew B. Kahng's accompanying News & Views article was retracted; the retraction notice said that new information about the methods used in the Google paper had become available after publication and had changed the author’s assessment, and it also said that Nature was conducting an independent investigation of the paper’s performance claims. By late September 2024, the editor's note was removed without explanation, but Nature published an addendum to the original paper (dated 26 September 2024). The addendum introduced the name AlphaChip for the proposed RL technique and described methodological details that critics had previously identified as missing, including the use of initial $(x,y)$ locations. The addendum addressed some methodological details but still lacked the full training and evaluation inputs needed for independent replication.

== Author responses ==
Lead authors Azalia Mirhoseini and Anna Goldie rejected internal allegations of fraud or serious methodological flaws, describing whistleblower Satrajit Chatterjee's complaints as a "campaign of misinformation." Google spokespeople stated that the method had been vetted, open-sourced, independently replicated, and deployed "around the world." Academics replied that independent replications had not shown the result claimed, and the use of AlphaChip in production does not prove its superiority over prior methods. Google researchers also argued that critics omitted pre-training and used insufficient compute. In response, academics pointed out that Google code release included no support for pre-training, the examples used for pre-training were not publicly available, and the compute used in attempted replication equaled the levels reported in the paper. Goldie, Mirhoseini, and Dean responded to the CACM paper with a letter to the editor, describing its meta-analysis as "regurgitating… unpublished, non-peer-reviewed arguments" and containing "thinly veiled fraud allegations already found to be without merit by Nature."

In December 2024, ACM's editor-in-chief, James Larus, publicly invited Jeff Dean and his co-authors to submit their technical response to critiques for peer review.

== See also ==
- Criticism of Google
- Google Brain
