= Tabula, Inc. =

- Company type: Private
- Industry: Semiconductors
- Founded: 2003
- Founder: Steve Teig
- Defunct: 2015
- Headquarters: Santa Clara, California, USA
- Key people: Dennis Segers (CEO), Steve Teig (CTO)
- Products: Three-dimensional integrated circuit (3-D FPGA)
- Number of employees: >100
- Website: www.tabula.com

Tabula, Inc., was an American fabless semiconductor company based in Santa Clara, California. Founded in 2003 by Steve Teig (ex-CTO of Cadence), it raised $215 million in venture funding. The company designed and built three dimensional field programmable gate arrays (3-D FPGAs) and ranked third on the Wall Street Journal's annual "Next Big Thing" list in 2012.

== Products ==
Tabula developed ABAX, a family of three-dimensional integrated circuits. The company's field-programmable gate array (FPGA) chips were marketed as 3-D programmable logic devices or 3PLDs. The chips have 220-630 thousand 4-input lookup table (LUT) from the user point of view and are capable of working at 1.6 GHz physical clock speed. They also contain up to 1280 digital signal processing (DSP) blocks with 18x18 multipliers with pre-adder; up to 920 GPIO pins and 48 SerDes channels (up to 6.5 Gbit/s). ABAX are produced using 40 nm TSMC process and packaged in flip-chip packages with 1936 or 1156 pins.

Internally, ABAX chips use high-frequency (1.6 GHz) reconfiguration between up to 8 config states, named folds, to emulate a high number of FPGA-resources. If all 8 folds are used to get maximum LUT capacity, user visible clock speed will be 200 MHz; for 4 folds capacity is halved but frequency is doubled and so on.

Volume price of ABAX chips was planned in 2012 to be in the range of 100-200 USD.

Tabula also offered some network solutions, such as: 100 or 40 Gb Ethernet to Interlaken bridges; high-speed packet search engines; and multiport 10 gigabit Ethernet processors (which could be used as switch, router, or programmable NIC).

In February 2012, Tabula confirmed it would use 22-nm manufacturing process on Intel's Factories. As of July 2013, only 5 companies were allowed to use Intel's manufacturing process: Achronix; Tabula; Netronome; Microsemi; and Altera.

Spacetime was a product of Tabula that possibly went beyond the abilities of FPGAs. The company said that Spacetime represented two spatial dimensions and one time dimension as a unified 3D framework. According to Tabula, this appeared to be a simplification that might deliver in production a new category of programmable devices (“3PLDs”) that are denser, faster, and more capable than FPGAs, yet still accompanied by software that automatically maps traditional RTL onto these novel fabrics.

On 24 March 2015, Tabula officially shut down.

== See also ==
- Altera
- Xilinx
- Achronix
