= Rent's rule =

Observation in computer circuit design

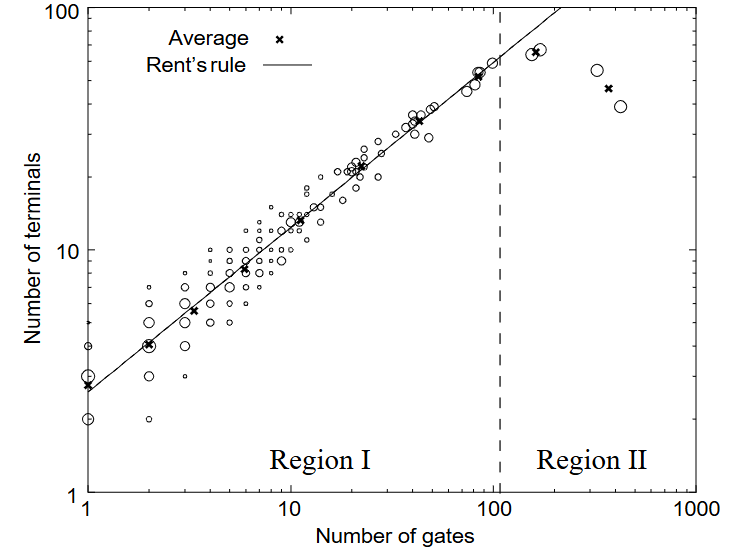
Experimental data of terminals to gates on a log-log plot conforming to Rent's rule

Rent's rule is an empirical observation about the organization of computing logic, specifically the relationship between the number of external signal connections to a logic block (i.e., the number of pins) with the number of logic gates in the logic block, and has been applied to circuits ranging from small digital circuits to mainframe computers. Put simply, it states that there is a simple power law relationship between these two values (pins and gates).

== E. F. Rent's discovery and first publications ==
In the 1960s, E. F. Rent, an IBM employee, found a remarkable trend between the number of pins (terminals, T) at the boundaries of integrated circuit designs at IBM and the number of internal components (g), such as logic gates or standard cells. On a log–log plot, these datapoints were on a straight line, implying a power-law relation $T = t g^p$, where t and p are constants (p < 1.0, and generally 0.5 < p < 0.8).

Rent's findings in IBM-internal memoranda were published in the IBM Journal of Research and Development in 2005, but the relation was described in 1971 by Landman and Russo. They performed a hierarchical circuit partitioning in such a way that at each hierarchical level (top-down) the fewest interconnections had to be cut to partition the circuit (in more or less equal parts). At each partitioning step, they noted the number of terminals and the number of components in each partition and then partitioned the sub-partitions further. They found the power-law rule applied to the resulting T versus g plot and named it Rent's rule.

Rent's rule is an empirical result based on observations of existing designs, and therefore it is less applicable to the analysis of non-traditional circuit architectures. However, it provides a useful framework with which to compare similar architectures.

== Theoretical basis ==
Christie and Stroobandt later derived Rent's rule theoretically for homogeneous systems and pointed out that the amount of optimization achieved in placement is reflected by the parameter $p$, the Rent exponent, which also depends on the circuit topology. In particular, values $p<1$ correspond to a greater fraction of short interconnects. The constant $t$ in Rent's rule can be viewed as the average number of terminals required by a single logic block, since $T = t$ when $g = 1$.

== Special cases and applications ==
Random arrangement of logic blocks typically have $p=1$. Larger values are impossible, since the maximal number of terminals for any region containing g logic components in a homogeneous system is given by $T = t g$. Lower bounds on p depend on the interconnection topology, since it is generally impossible to make all wires short. This lower bound $p*$ is often called the intrinsic Rent exponent, a notion first introduced by Hagen et al. It can be used to characterize optimal placements and also measure the interconnection complexity of a circuit. Higher (intrinsic) Rent exponent values correspond to a higher topological complexity. One extreme example ($p=0$) is a long chain of logic blocks, while a clique has $p=1$. In realistic 2D circuits, $p*$ ranges from 0.5 for highly-regular circuits (such as SRAM) to 0.75 for random logic.

System performance analysis tools such as BACPAC typically use Rent's rule to calculate expected wiring lengths and wiring demands.

Rent's rule has been shown to apply among the regions of the brain of Drosophila fruit fly, using synapses instead of gates, and neurons which extend both inside and outside the region as pins.

== Estimating Rent's exponent ==
To estimate Rent's exponent, one can use top-down partitioning, as used in min-cut placement. For every partition, count the number of terminals connected to the partition and compare it to the number of logic blocks in the partition. Rent's exponent can then be found by fitting these datapoints on a log–log plot, resulting in an exponent p. For optimally partitioned circuits, $p' = p*$ but this is no longer the case for practical (heuristic) partitioning approaches. For partitioning-based placement algorithms $p^* \leq p' \leq p$.

== Region II of Rent's rule ==
Landman and Russo found a deviation of Rent's rule near the far end, i.e., for partitions with a large number of blocks, which is known as Region II of Rent's Rule. A similar deviation also exists for small partitions and has been found by Stroobandt, who called it Region III.

== Rentian wirelength estimation ==
Another IBM employee, Donath, discovered that Rent's rule can be used to estimate the average wirelength and the wirelength distribution in VLSI chips. This motivated the System Level Interconnect Prediction workshop, founded in 1999, and an entire community working on wirelength prediction (see a survey by Stroobandt). The resulting wirelength estimates have been improved significantly since then and are now used for technology exploration. The use of Rent's rule allows to perform such estimates a priori (i.e., before actual placement) and thus predict the properties of future technologies (clock frequencies, number of routing layers needed, area, power) based on limited information about future circuits and technologies.

A comprehensive overview of work based on Rent's rule has been published by Stroobandt.

== See also ==
- Electronic design automation
- Integrated circuit design
- Network architecture
- Network on a chip
