= Digital clock manager =

A digital clock manager (DCM) is an electronic component available on some field-programmable gate arrays (FPGAs) (notably ones produced by Xilinx). A digital clock manager is useful for manipulating clock signals inside the FPGA, and to avoid clock skew which would introduce errors in the circuit.

== Uses ==
Digital clock managers have the following applications:

- Multiplying or dividing an incoming clock (which can come from outside the FPGA or from a Digital Frequency Synthesizer [DFS]).
- Making sure the clock has a steady duty cycle.
- Adding a phase shift with the additional use of a delay-locked loop.
- Eliminating clock skew within an FPGA design.

== See also ==
- Phase-locked loop
