= Port expander =

A port expander is computer hardware that allows more than one device to connect to a single port on a computer. The VIC-20, for example, used a port expander to allow more than one cartridge to connect to the single ROM cartridge port.

A port expander can be any device to which one existing or onboard port becomes two or more - for example: a KVM switch or a USB hub. Such expanders offer the advantage of allowing more devices of a particular port type to be utilized at the same time. A major downside is that, for example, a 3 Gbit/s port might have a hub or expander installed and now be able to accommodate 6 devices, but at a maximum of 3 Gbit/s throughput bandwidth divided by the said 6 devices, or by however many are plugged in and being used. A port expander is a device that allows one port on a computer system to connect to multiple devices. Two basic forms of port expander exist: internal and external. An internal expander has a connection inside the computer, typically on the motherboard, and the only part the user sees is the expansion plate containing multiple ports. An external device plugs into the existing port and then has multiple places to connect. When not part of a computer system, these devices are commonly known as splitters.

In the non-computer world, splitters are very common. Extension cords and power strips are in nearly every modern home. Both of these devices will split a single outlet to multiple devices. Cable splitters also operate in many homes, allowing a single coaxial cable to provide cable television to multiple sets. Some systems may even use an A/B box, a device that connects multiple sets of devices to the same system, with users switching between them by flipping between the A or B mode.

These devices all perform the same basic job that a port expander does. The expander will connect to a single spot, but have multiple connections for devices. They go by several names, such as "switch", "hub" or "splitter", but they all do the same thing. Manufacturers have produced expanders for nearly every type of port, but the most common household versions connect to universal serial bus (USB) or to Ethernet ports.

== See also ==
- Docking station
