= Achronix =

Achronix Semiconductor Corporation
- Type: Private
- Industry: Semiconductors
- Founded: 2004; 22 years ago in Ithaca, New York, U.S.
- Founders: Clinton Kelly; John Lofton Holt; Virantha Ekanayake; Rajit Manohar
- Headquarters: Santa Clara, California, United States
- Key people: Robert Blake (CEO); Steve Mensor (CMO)
- Products: FPGA, eFPGA IP
- Website: achronix.com

Achronix Semiconductor Corporation is an American fabless semiconductor company based in Santa Clara, California with an additional R&D facility in Bangalore, India, and an additional sales office in Shenzhen, China. Achronix is a diversified fabless semiconductor company that sells FPGA products, embedded FPGA (eFPGA) products, system-level products and supporting design tools. Achronix was founded in 2004 in Ithaca, New York based on technology licensed from Cornell University. In 2006, Achronix moved its headquarters to Silicon Valley.

Achronix was originally self-funded by several million dollars of founder's capital. Since 2006, Achronix has been funded by a combination of venture capital funding, private equity funding and debt from traditional lenders.

In July 2021 Achronix cancelled its plans to go public through a merger with a special acquisition (SPAC) company ACE Convergence Acquisition Corp due to regulatory approval difficulties. The proposed transaction valued the company at $2.1bn.

== Products ==
- Speedster7t FPGAs - Standalone FPGA devices built on TSMC 7 nm FinFET technology. It includes a 2D Network-on-Chip (NoC), GDDR6 memory interfaces, up to 72 transceivers operating at 1-112 Gbit/s, 400G Ethernet MACs, PCIe Gen5 controllers and up to 1,760 machine learning processors (MLP) for mathematical operations with variable precision number formats.
- Speedcore eFPGAs - Embedded FPGA IP that is integrated into a SoC or ASIC device. It consists of customer defined amounts of reconfigurable logic blocks, logic and block RAM, DSP blocks and Machine Learning Process (MLP) blocks. Speedcore is supported in TSMC 16FF+, TSMC 7 nm FinFET and TSMC 12FFC is under development.
- VectorPath Accelerator Cards - PCIe card which is based on the Speedster7t FPGA family. This card includes 400G and 200G network interfaces, 8 GDDR6 memories, and additional expansion ports for custom connectivity.
- ACE - FPGA development tools which are used to design for all of Achronix's FPGA and eFPGA devices.

== See also ==
- Altera
- Xilinx
