= List of EDA companies =

A list of notable electronic design automation (EDA) companies.

== Existing companies ==
=== Software companies ===
Company	EDA products
Aldec	Active-HDL; HES-DVM; HES; Riviera-PRO; ALINT-PRO; Spec-TRACER; TySOM
Altium (Subsidiary of Renesas Electronics)	Altium Develop; Altium Designer - Schematic Capture, PCB Design and Simulation; Cloud Workspace - Optional Cloud Repository (No Storage Limit) for Design Data, including Schematics, PCBs, BOMs; Embedded Version Control - All Designs saved to Cloud Workspace Automatically Version Controlled; MCAD CoDesigner - Real-time 3D-Model Synchronization Between ECAD/MCAD Teams; Requirements Portal - Requirements Declarations, Tracking and Verification Application; BOM Portal - Component Sourcing and Procurement Application with Manageable Releases; SPICE Simulation - Embedded in Schematic Capture Capability; DC Power Network Analysis - RGB Heatmapping of Current Density and Voltage Drop for Power Electronics; Altium Agile; Altium Develop Features (including Altium Designer); Additional Administrative Controls (SSO, Private Server Options, Workspace Folder-Level Permissions, GovCloud Capabilities, Support for 6+ Concurrent Users); Protel PCB (discontinued); P-CAD (discontinued - former EDA from Accel Technologies); Autotrax (discontinued); EasyTrax (discontinued); Through Upverter Acquisition: Upverter - online EDA; Schematic Capture; PCB Layout; System Design Tool; Through Perception Software Acquisition: EDAConnect
Arteris	Through Magillem Design Services Acquisition: Packaging: MRE, MIP; Connectivity: MPA, MVP; Registers: MRV; Embedded software: MSE, MSX; CAD Flows: MDL, MCS, MGS; Through Semifore Acquisition: CSRCompiler; Through Cycuity Acquisition: RADIX; RADIX-S; RADIX-M; RADIX-ST
Autodesk	EAGLE; Fusion 360 (Electronics Design feature); 123D Circuits (formerly Circuits.io; discontinued) - online EDA; Electronics Lab; PCB Design; Circuit Scribe; MESH; Autodesk Library.io - parts library management tool; Tinkercad Circuits (formerly Electronics Lab)
Cadence Design Systems	System Development Suite with Verification Computing Platform, Virtual System Platform, Incisive Verification Platform, and Rapid Prototyping Platform; C-to-Silicon; Verification IP Catalog; Design IP; Chip Planning Solution; Virtuoso - IC Artist; Virtuoso - IC Layout; Virtuoso - Layout Migrate; Innovus - Digital IC design; Encounter - Digital IC design; Encounter - Conformal-LEC; Encounter - Conformal Low Power; Encounter - Conformal ECO Designer; Encounter - Conformal Constraint Designer; Encounter - RTL Compiler; Encounter - RTL Compiler Physical; Encounter - Test ATPG; Encounter - Test Diagnostics; Encounter - Design Implementation; Encounter - QRC (Extraction & Checking); Encounter - Nanoroute; Allegro - PC/MCM design; Incisive - functional verification; Design for Manufacturing; Specctra autorouter; OrCAD; PSpice; Denali Software products; Specctra; PureSpec; MMAV; Databahn; Blueprint; Sigrity products; OptimizePI; PowerDC; XtractIM; PowerSI; Broadband SPICE; SPEED2000; Channel Designer; XcitePI; OrbitIO Planner; Unified Package Designer (UPD) acquired from Synopsys; Forte Design Systems products; Cynthesizer; Through AWR Corporation Acquisition: Platform: AWR Design Environment – high frequency (RF/microwave) design; Simulators: Microwave Office – RF/microwave circuit simulation, APLAC – Harmonic balance solver for nonlinear, frequency domain circuit simulation; Analog Office – analog/RFIC simulation; Visual System Simulator (VSS) - system level communication/radar simulator; EM solvers: AXIEM (3D planar electromagnetic simulator) – 3D planar, Method of Moments; Analyst (Arbitrary 3D FEM simulator) – full 3D, finite element method with adaptive meshing; AntSyn – Antenna Synthesis; Through Integrand Software Acquisition: EMX; Continuum; PCELLS; Through Arm Artisan Foundation IP Business Acquisition: Artisan Memory Compilers; Through ChipStack Acquisition: ChipStack MentalModelAgent; ChipStack FormalAgent; ChipStack UnitSimAgent
COSEDA Technologies	COSIDE
Dassault Systèmes	Through CST acquisition: CST Studio Suite; CST MICROWAVE STUDIO (CST MWS); CST EM STUDIO (CST EMS); CST PARTICLE STUDIO (CST PS); CST CABLE STUDIO (CST CS); CST PCB STUDIO (CST PCBS); CST BOARDCHECK; CST MPHYSICS STUDIO (CST MPS) - electronics cooling; CST DESIGN STUDIO (CST DS); IdEM; generation of macromodels
EasyEDA	EasyEDA - online EDA; Schematic capture; SPICE simulation; PCB layout
EasyLogix - Schindler & Schill GmbH	PCB-Investigator - Professional ECAD Workstation for PCB development; GerberLogix - Free Gerber Viewer; Online-Gerber-Viewer - Free Gerber Viewer (no installation required)
Emerson Electric	Through National Instruments Acquisition: National Instruments Electronics Workbench Group; NI Multisim - schematic capture and simulation; NI Ultiboard - printed circuit board layout editor
Empyrean Technology	Empyrean Aether
Eremex	TopoR - topological router for printed circuit boards laid out in any compatible systems that use the PCAD ASCII PCB, PADS ASCII PCB or DSN format; SimOne - circuit simulation (the basic circuit analyses common to SPICE modeling systems + stability analysis); Delta Design - software tool for electronic design automation (EDA)
IC Manage	GDP Design & IP Management, Envision Design Progress Analytics, Envision Verification Analytics, High Performance Computing
Ing.-Büro FRIEDRICH	TARGET 3001! PCB Layout CAD Software: Schematic editor; Simulation PSpice compliant; PCB design; Front panel design; SQL component database; 3D model design, STEP Import, STEP Export; PCB assembly price calculator; Electra: High speed auto router; COMPONIVERSE: A component exchange; MID Design
PathWave Design; Keysight Technologies EDA division (formerly EEsof)	Platforms: PathWave Advanced Design System – high frequency and high speed design; PathWave EM Design (formerly EMPro and Antenna Modeling Design System) – 3D EM platform; PathWave RFIC Design (formerly GoldenGate which supersedes RF Design Environment) – RFIC/RF mixed signal simulator (Xpedion acquisition); PathWave Device Modeling (formerly IC-CAP), PathWave Model Builder (formerly MBP), PathWave Model QA (formerly MQA) – Device modeling and validation (all but IC-CAP from Accelicon acquisition); PathWave RF Synthesis (formerly Genesys) - RF and microwave design (Eagleware-Elanix acquisition); PathWave System Design (formerly SystemVue) - Electronic system-level design (Eagleware-Elanix acquisition); EM solvers: Momentum – 3D planar, frequency domain, available with the ADS, Genesys, and GoldenGate platforms; FEM Element – full 3D, frequency domain, available with the ADS and EMPro platforms; FDTD – full 3D, time domain, available with the EMPro platform; Through Cliosoft Acquisition: Keysight Design Data Management (formerly Cliosoft SOS); Keysight IP Management (formerly Cliosoft HUB); Keysight Visual Design Diff (formerly Cliosoft VDD); Through Ansys PowerArtist Acquisition: Keysight PowerArtist: RTL Design for Power Platform
Lauterbach	in-circuit debuggers (JTAG and non-JTAG) with optional trace functionality; in-circuit emulators; front-ends to debug virtual platforms for embedded software development (ESL)
Siemens / Siemens Digital Industries Software	Questa One; Through Mentor Graphics Acquisition: ADiT - Nanometer IC Design: fast SPICE; Questa ADMS - Nanometer IC Design: mixed-signal simulator; Board Station - PCB design software; Calibre - physical verification; Catapult Synthesis - ESL Design: high-level synthesis; Catapult Library Builder - ESL Design: high-level synthesis; Design Architect-IC - Nanometer IC Design; Eldo - Nanometer IC Design: SPICE simulator; Eldo RF - Nanometer IC Design: SPICE simulator; Expedition - PCB design software; IP - intellectual property (now part of embedded systems division); ModelSim LE - Nanometer IC Design: digital design and simulation; Linux-based simulator with Dataflow Window and Waveform Compare; ModelSim PE - Nanometer IC Design: digital design and simulation; Windows-based simulator for VHDL, Verilog, or mixed-language simulation environments; ModelSim SE - Nanometer IC Design: digital design and simulation; tri-lingual simulator with VHDL, Verilog, and SystemC; Nimbic products; Nucleus EDGE - embedded systems development tools; Inflexion - embedded systems application platform tools; Nucleus OS - embedded systems OS; Olympus-SoC - place and route; PADS - PCB design software (Innoveda acquisition); Platform Express Professional - ESL Design: platform-based design; Platform Express Integrator's Kit - ESL Design: platform-based design; Platform Express Client - ESL Design: platform-based design; Questa - digital and mixed-signal simulation; System Architect - ESL Design: system analysis; SystemVision - Mechatronic Design: system analysis; Tessent suite for test; Tessent TestKompress; Tessent BoundaryScan; Tessent FastScan; Tessent IJTAG; Tessent LogicBIST; Tessent Scan/ScanPro; Vista - ESL Design: system debug; Visual Elite - ESL Design: system integration; Veloce/Veloce2 - high speed, high capacity SoC emulation; Through LogicVision Acquisition; Dragonfly - Embedded test IP insertion tool for logic, memory and mixed-signal testing; Silicon Insight - Interactive program that works with 3rd party testers for controlling and logging of data on the device for at-speed testing; Yield Insight - Yield analysis program which looks at foundry and performance data to diagnose possible problems; HDL Designer Series; Through Solido Design Automation Acquisition; Solido Variation Designer - variation-aware design of custom integrated circuits; Fast PVT—verify against process, voltage, and temperature corners; Fast Monte Carlo—verification against 3-sigma process (statistical) variation; High-Sigma Monte Carlo—verification against high-sigma process (statistical) variation; Cell Optimizer—automated sizing of custom ICs; Through Austemper Design Systems Acquisition: SafetyScope: Computes the FIT rates and diagnostic coverage metrics for permanent and transient faults; Annealer: Safety synthesis tools for adding error correcting codes (ECC), error detection codes (EDC), block level duplication or triple instances or design.; RadioScope: Safety synthesis tools for adding ECC or EDC to banks of flops, duplication of critical sections of the design, addition of illegal condition checks.; KaleidoScope: Fault campaign tool capable of fault propagation and disposition of injected faults into detected, safe and undetected faults.; Through UltraSoC Acquisition: Tessent Embedded Analytics; Through Avatar Integrated Systems Acquisition: Aprisa-Place and route(PnR) systems; Apogee; Through OneSpin Solutions Acquisition: 360 DV-Inspect; 360 DV-Verify; 360 DV-Certify; 360 EC-FPGA; 360 EC-ASIC; 360 EC-RTL; FMEDA; Through Fractal Technologies Acquisition: Solido Crosscheck (formerly Crossfire); Through InsightEDA Acquisition: Insight Analyzer; Through Altair Engineering Acquisition: HyperSpice; Through RunTime Design Automation Acquisition; Altair FlowTracer; Through Polliwog Acquisition; Altair PollEx; PollExPCB - PCB viewer and knowledge-based design-verification toolset for PCB; PollExLogic - PCB schematic tool to import and view schematic sheets, designs, check symbols, nets, and object properties.; PollExCP - Cross Probe for design comparison (Board to borad, and board to schematic to BOM); PollExBOM - BOM parsing and formatting tool; PollExCAM - To handle any type of Gerber data and compare revisions; PollExUPE - A unified part library management system; Through Concept Engineering Acquisition; StarVision PRO; RTLvision PRO; GateVision PRO; SpiceVision PRO; Nlview; Through Powersim Acquisition; Altair PSIM; Through Metrics Design Automation Acquisition; Altair DSim; Through DownStream Technologies Acquisition: BluePrint-PCB; DFMStream; CAM350; Through Excellicon Acquisition: ConMan; ConCert; ConTree; ConStruct; Through ASTER Technologies Acquisition: QuadView; DfMExpress; TestWay Express; FabExpress; twDocumentor; Through Defacto Technologies Acquisition: SoC Compiler
Mirabilis Design	VisualSim Architect; Systems Specification and Design; Hardware Design; Software Validation; Power Exploration
MathWorks	For logical FPGA and ASIC designs: Deep Learning HDL Toolbox - Prototype and deploy deep learning networks on FPGAs and SoCs; DSP HDL Toolbox - Design digital signal processing applications for FPGAs, ASICs, and SoCs; HDL Coder - Generate Verilog, SystemVerilog, and VHDL code for FPGA and ASIC designs; HDL Verifier - Test and verify Verilog and VHDL using HDL simulators and FPGA boards; SoC Blockset - Design, analyze, and deploy hardware/software applications for AMD and Intel SoC devices; Vision HDL Toolbox - Design image processing, video, and computer vision systems for FPGAs and ASICs; Wireless HDL Toolbox - Design and implement wireless communications subsystems for FPGAs, ASICs, and SoCs; For physical PCB and ASIC designs: Antenna Toolbox - Design, analyze, and visualize antenna elements and antenna arrays; Mixed-Signal Blockset - Design, analyze, and simulate analog and mixed-signal systems; RF Blockset - Design and simulate RF systems; RF PCB Toolbox - Perform electromagnetic analysis of printed circuit boards; RF Toolbox - Design, model, and analyze networks of RF components; SerDes Toolbox - Design SerDes systems and generate PAMn IBIS-AMI models for high-speed digital interconnects; Signal Integrity Toolbox - Design, simulate, and analyze high-speed serial and parallel links
Novarm	DipTrace; Schematic Editor; PCB Design; SPICE Simulator
Silvaco	SPICE modeling and analog & mixed-signal simulation: Utmost IV - Device characterization and SPICE modeling; SmartSpice - Analog circuit simulator; SmartSpice RF - Frequency and time domain RF circuit simulator; Harmony - Analog/mixed-signal circuit simulator; SmartView - Simulation waveform viewer; Custom IC CAD: Gateway - Schematic editor; Expert - Layout editor; Guardian - DRC/LVS/NET physical verification; Hipex - Full-chip parasitic extraction; Jivaro - Parasitic reduction and analysis; VarMan - High-sigma variability analysis; Interconnect modeling: Quest - 3D RF passive device modeling; Clever - Parasitic extractor for realistic 3D structures; Stellar - 3D physics-based parasitic extractor for carga cells; Exact - Full-chip LPE rule file generator; Library Platform: Cello - Standard cell library creation, migration and optimization; Viola - Standard cell library and I/O cell characterization; Liberty Analyzer - Analysis and validation of timing, power, noise and area data from characterization; TCAD: Victory Process - 2D/3D semiconductor process simulator; Victory Device - 2D/3D semiconductor device simulator; Virtual Wafer Fab - Emulation of wafer manufacturing to perform design-of-experiments and optimization.; Through Coupling Wave Solutions assets' Acquisition: WaveIntegrity; SiPEX; Through Polyteda Cloud Acquisition: PowerDRC/LVS - DRC/LVS physical verification; Nefelus CMS
Synopsys	Cosmos Scope; Custom Designer; Design Compiler; DFT Compiler; DFTMAX compression; Formality; Hercules - physical verification; HSIM; HSPICE; IC Compiler - place and route; IC Validator; NANOSIM; OptoCompiler; Physical Compiler; Proteus OPC; Protocol Analyzer (debugging tool); PrimeTime - static timing analysis; Saber; Sentaurus TCAD; Spice explorer; Synphony C Compiler - high-level synthesis; TetraMAX ATPG; VCS; VIP; XA; Yield Explorer - yield management; Viewlogic products; Powerview (discontinued); Through Avant! Acquisition: Astro - place and route; Star-RCXT; Through Magma Design Automation Acquisition: FineSim; SiliconSmart; Through Synplicity Acquisition: Synplify Pro; Through Terrain EDA Acquisition: Euclide (formerly VerIDE); Through Dorado Design Automation (Dorado DA) Acquisition: ECO System; Tweaker-T1 Timing ECO; Tweaker-P1 Leakage Power ECO; Tweaker-P2 Dynamic Power ECO; Tweaker-C1 Clock ECO; Tweaker-M1 Metal ECO; Tweaker-F1 Functional ECO; Recovery System; Tweaker-A1 Area Recovery; Tweaker-P1 Dynamic Power Recovery; Tweaker-R1 Reliability Recovery; Through Silicon Frontline Technology Acquisition: PrimeESD; Power Device WorkBench; Through Ansys Acquisition: Ansys HFSS (formerly Ansoft HFSS) - High-Frequency Structure Simulation; Apache Design, Inc. products: RedHawk: Full-chip Dynamic SoC Power Integrity Solution; Totem: Analog and Mixed-Signal Power & Noise Platform; Sentinel: Chip-Package-System Co-design/Co-analysis Solution; PathFinder: Layout-based ESD Integrity Solution; Through Helic Acquisition; Pharos; VeloceRF; RaptorX; Exalto; Through DfR Solutions Acquisition; Sherlock Automated Design Analysis; Through Diakopto Acquisition; ParagonX; PrimeX
WestDev	Pulsonix; Pulsonix Schematic Capture; Pulsonix Advanced PCB Layout; Embedded Component Technology; Flexi-rigid Circuit Design; Chip-on-board Design; Spice Mixed Mode A/D Simulation; Constraints Driven Interactive High Speed Design; Shape Based Autorouter; Product Life Management(PLM) Interface; Corporate Database Connection Interface; 3D View
Zuken	Cabling Designer; Cadstar; CR-5000; CR-8000; Visula

=== FPGA companies ===
Company	EDA products
Achronix	Achronix Tool Suite; ACE
Altera (formerly Intel Programmable Solutions Group; Subsidiary of Intel)	Intel acquired Altera in 2015.: Intel Quartus Prime (formerly Altera Quartus)
Dialog Semiconductor (Subsidiary of Renesas Electronics)	Dialog Semiconductor acquired Silego Technology Inc. in 2017.: GreenPAK Designer
Lattice Semiconductor	Lattice Diamond; iCEcube2
Microsemi (Subsidiary of Microchip Technology)	Microsemi acquired Actel in 2010.: Libero
Xilinx (Subsidiary of AMD)	ISE Design Suite; Xilinx Vivado

=== Electronics distribution companies ===
Company	EDA products
DigiKey	Scheme-it - online EDA; developed by Aspen Labs (subsidiary of Arrow Electronics).
RS Components	DesignSpark PCB - free EDA software

=== Development communities ===
Community	EDA products
gEDA	gschem: schematics editor; pcb: PCB layout editor; gerbv: Gerber file viewer
KiCad (GPL)	eeschema - schematic capture; PCBnew - PCB layout; gerbview - Gerber viewer
Ringdove EDA (GPL)	sch-rnd: schematics editor; pcb-rnd: PCB layout editor; camv-rnd: Gerber (and other CAM) file viewer; route-rnd: PCB autorouter

== Defunct companies ==
EDA companies that no longer exist
Analog Design Automation	acquired by Synopsys in 2004: Creative Genius - Automated sizing of analog integrated circuits; IP Explorer - High-dimensional visualization of analog performance tradeoffs
Ansoft Corporation	acquired by Ansys
Applicon	Acquired by Schlumberger in 1980.
Applied Wave Research	acquired by Cadence Design Systems: Microwave Office; Analog Office; Visual System Simulator; APLAC; AXIEM
ARC International	acquired by Synopsys: ARC VTOC
Automated Systems, Inc.	acquired by Cadence Design Systems in 1990: PRANCE GT - Placement, Routing and Numerical Control Editing for PCB design and layout
Avant! Corporation	acquired by Synopsys in 2002. Avant! itself resulted from the merger of ArcSys and Integrated Silicon Systems on November 27, 1995. It acquired Anagram on September 27, 1996, Meta-Software on October 29, 1996, FrontLine Design Automation on November 27, 1996, and Nexsyn Design Technology on December 31, 1996.
Azuro	acquired by Cadence in 2011: PowerCentric - Clock tree synthesis and automatic clock gating; Rubix - Physical optimization and automatic useful skew
CadSoft Computer	acquired by Autodesk in 2016
Calma	merged into Valid, then Cadence Design Systems
Ciranova	Acquired by Synopsys in 2012
CoFluent Design	acquired by Intel in 2011: CoFluent Studio; CoFluent Reader
Computervision	Merged into Prime Computer in 1988. Computervision Electrical Design software purchased by INCASES in 1994.
Coware	acquired by Synopsys in 2010
CST -– Computer Simulation Technology	acquired by Dassault Systèmes in 2016
Daisy Systems	merged with Cadnetix in 1988
Denali Software	acquired by Cadence Design Systems in Q2 of 2010
ECAD, Inc.	merged with SDA Systems in 1987 to create Cadence
Forte Design Systems	acquired by Cadence Design Systems in 2014: Cynthesizer
Gateway Design Automation	acquired by Cadence Design Systems in 1989: Verilog HDL; Verilog-XL
IKOS Systems	acquired by Mentor Graphics in 2002: NSIM - gate-level simulation accelerator HW; Gemini - Verilog simulation accelerator product; Voyager - VHDL simulation accelerator product
Interactive Image Technologies or Electronics Workbench	acquired by National Instruments in 2005
LogicVision	acquired by Mentor Graphics in 2009
Magma Design Automation	acquired by Synopsys in 2012
NanGate	acquired by Silvaco in 2018
Nimbic (formerly Physware)	acquired by Mentor in 2014
OrCAD	acquired by Cadence in 1999
Protel	renamed as Altium
Racal-Redac	Acquired by Zuken in 1994
Solido Design Automation	acquired by Siemens in 2017
SpringSoft, Inc.	acquired by Synopsys: Verdi - automated debug system; Debussy - debug modules; Siloti - visibility enhancement solutions; Certitude - Functional Qualification System; Laker - Custom Layout System
Tanner EDA	acquired by Mentor Graphics in 2015
Valid Logic Systems	merged into Cadence
Upverter	acquired by Altium in 2017
DAFCA	ClearBlue
Spectrum Software	closed in 2019: Micro-Cap
UniCAD	Acquired by CCT (Cooper & Chyan Technology)

== See also ==
- List of items in the category Electronic Design Automation companies
- Comparison of EDA software
- List of open-source EDA software
- Cadence Design Systems: Acquisitions and mergers
- List of semiconductor companies by country
- Synopsys: Acquisitions, mergers, spinoffs
