= GreenPAK =

Mixed-signal integrated circuit brand

GreenPAK™ is a Renesas Electronics family of mixed-signal integrated circuits and development tools. GreenPAK circuits are classified as configurable mixed-signal ICs. This category is characterized by analogue and digital blocks that can be configured through programmable non-volatile memory. These devices also have a "Connection Matrix", which supports routing signals between the various blocks. These devices can include multiple components within a single IC.

Also, the company developed the Go Configure™ Software Hub for IC design creation, chip emulation, and programming.

== History ==
The GreenPAK technology was developed by Silego Technology Inc. The company was established in 2001. The GreenPAK product line was introduced in April 2010. Then, the first generation of ICs was released. Later, Silego was acquired by Dialog Semiconductor PLC in 2017. Officially, the trademark for the GreenPAK title was registered in 2019.

Currently, in the market, the sixth generation of GreenPAK ICs was already released. Over 6 billion GreenPAK ICs have been shipped to Dialog's customers all over the world.

In 2021, Dialog was acquired by Renesas Electronics, therefore the GreenPAK technology is currently officially owned by Renesas.

== GreenPAK Integrated Circuits ==
There are a few categories of ICs developed within the GreenPAK technology:

- Dual Supply GreenPAK – provides level translation from higher or lower voltage domains.
- GreenPAK with Power Switches – includes single and dual power switches up to 2A.
- GreenPAK with Asynchronous State Machine – allows the developing of customized state machine IC designs.
- GreenPAK with Low Power Dropout Regulators – enables a user to divide power loads using the unique concept of "Flexible Power Islands" devoted to wearable devices.
- GreenPAK with In-System Programmability – can be reprogrammed up to 1000 times using the I^{2}C serial interface.
- Automotive GreenPAK – allows multiple system functions in a single IC used for automotive circuit designs.
- GreenPAK with High Voltage Features – contains both mixed-signal logic and high-voltage H-bridge functionality.

== GreenPAK Designer Software ==
GreenPAK Designer Software is a free GUI-based platform that enables users to create IC designs without any programming language prior skills.

The software functions include:

- Access to a library of GreenPAK ICs with a description of available elements for each device as well as example application cases and technical documentation
- Designing integral circuits using schematic-oriented capturing of elements and their connection
- Simulation of created designs
- Samples programming

== Development Tools ==
Two development boards allow engineers to conduct different procedures mentioned in the table below.

"' Board/Functions'"	" 'Programming'"	" 'Emulation'"	" 'Signal'" "' and Logic Generators'"
GreenPAK DIP Development Platform	x	x	
"' GreenPAK Advanced Development Platform'"	x	x	x

The development boards are compatible with different GreenPAK ICs that can be checked on Dialog Semiconductor's website.

== Circuit Design Applications ==
Over 300 application notes were developed to showcase IC designs created in the GreenPAK Designer Software and provide complete project instructions.

== Origin of the Title ==
The "GreenPAK" title indicates the circuit's environmentally friendly nature. These circuits consume low power and use less lead during production, reducing their environmental impact. The "PAK" suffix stands for "Programmable Analog Kit," which highlights the device family's aim to provide a suite of analog resources, along with digital resources, that can be utilized to address various real-world application challenges.

== See also ==
- Configurable mixed-signal IC
- Silego Technology Inc.
- Dialog Semiconductor PLC
