= VWF =

VWF or vWF may refer to:

- Vibration white finger, a form of Raynaud's disease
- Virtual Wafer Fab, a CAD program (see Silvaco)
- Virtual Wrestling Foundation - see Pro Wrestling (NES video game)
- von Willebrand factor, a blood glycoprotein
- Variable-width font, synonym for proportional font
