= Empyrean Technology =

Chinese EDA Company

Empyrean Technology Co., Ltd.
- Trade name: Empyrean
- Native name: 北京华大九天科技股份有限公司
- Type: Public; State-owned enterprise
- Traded as: SZSE: 301269
- Industry: Semiconductors; Software
- Founded: May 26, 2009; 17 years ago
- Founder: Liu Weiping
- Headquarters: Beijing, China
- Key people: Liu Weiping (Chairman); Yang Xiaodong (CEO)
- Revenue: ▲CN¥1.01 billion (2023)
- Net income: ▲CN¥200.35 million (2023)
- Total assets: ▲CN¥5.54 billion (2023)
- Total equity: ▲CN¥4.78 billion (2023)
- Owners: China Electronics Corporation; China Integrated Circuit Industry Investment Fund
- Number of employees: 1,023 (2023)
- Website: www.empyrean.com.cn

Empyrean Technology (Empyrean; Chinese: 华大九天; pinyin: Huádà Jiǔtiān) is a partially state-owned publicly listed Chinese electronic design automation (EDA) company headquartered in Beijing.

== Background ==
Empyrean was founded in 2009 by Liu Weiping who worked on China's first domestic EDA tool 'Panda'.

Empyrean was funded by various state entities which include China Electronics Corporation (CEC), China Integrated Circuit Industry Investment Fund and Shenzhen Capital Group.

The establishment of Empyrean broke the EDA monopoly which was held by foreign companies such as Synopsys, Cadence Design Systems, and Siemens EDA and is seen as a way for China to achieve self sufficiency in the EDA industry. However, according to Guosen Securities, Empyrean has three limitations which are lacking support for the full digital chip design process, lacking support for advanced processes and lacking ability to manufacture and test EDA systems. As of April 2024, Empyrean currently holds 6% of China's market share making it the fourth biggest EDA player as well as the largest Chinese domestic EDA player.

In July 2022, Empyrean held its initial public offering becoming a listed company on the Shenzhen Stock Exchange. The proceeds would be used for several EDA development projects, including building analogue and digital chip design and verification tools.

In March 2023, Huawei announced that it would use domestic EDA software capable of the 14 nm process with Empyrean being speculated to be the reason for the breakthrough. In the same year, Empyrean stated its analog tools can already partially support 5 nm process, while its digital tools can fully support 7 nm process.

In December 2024, Empyrean was targeted in a new round of US export controls and added to the United States Department of Commerce's Entity List. Empyrean stated the impact is "generally controllable". Empyrean then ceded control of the company to CEC.

In March 2025, Empyrean announced it would acquire a majority stake in Shanghai-based Xpeedic Technology, a provider of EDA and system-in-package (SiP) design solutions.

In June 2025, Empyrean stated it planned to capitalize on US export controls that restricted foreign EDA from selling products to China.

== See also ==
- List of EDA companies
- Semiconductor industry in China
