= Micro-cap =

Micro-cap may refer to:

- Microcap stock, a market term
- Micro-Cap, a circuit simulator
