= Special paint schemes on racing cars =

Special paint schemes are one-time or limited time variations on a race car's typical appearance. Their use has historically been largely confined to NASCAR stock car racing, partially due to the much larger surface area of a stock car, and longer season, but have entered the IndyCar in a limited fashion. NASCAR's increased media coverage has contributed to their popularity with both fans and sponsors.

However, some sponsors and die-cast makers have advanced the promotion to other codes of motorsport, as Red Bull Racing had a Star Wars paint scheme to promote Revenge of the Sith in Formula One and a similar Superman one to promote Superman Returns. Panther Racing in the Indy Racing League ran a Pennzoil Platinum paint scheme at selected 2005 IRL events instead of the normal yellow design.

== History ==
=== 1991 Daytona 500: Winston Salutes the Troops ===
Special paint schemes in NASCAR date back to the 1991 Daytona 500. As part of an R. J. Reynolds promotion, five unsponsored drivers had paint schemes on their cars that paid tribute to the branches of the United States Armed Forces serving in Operation Desert Storm:

- No. 7: Alan Kulwicki – Army
- No. 18: Greg Sacks – Navy
- No. 24: Mickey Gibbs – Air Force
- No. 71: Dave Marcis – Coast Guard
- No. 88: Buddy Baker – Marines

=== Dale Earnhardt's "Quick Silver" ===
Alternate paint schemes truly gained notoriety in 1995, when Dale Earnhardt appeared at The Winston with a silver car (in tribute to Winston's silver anniversary) instead of his traditional black car. The car was nicknamed "Quick Silver" or "Silver Select". A year later, Earnhardt continued the trend at the 1996 running of The Winston with a 1996 Atlanta Olympics themed car.

Fan reaction to the paint schemes proved popular such that by the end of the decade, scarcely a race went by without one or more drivers sporting a special paint scheme. Often one-week special sponsorship deals were involved in the schemes, and other times existing sponsors chose to promote alternate products within the firm. Examples of one-week deals include promoting first run films coinciding with the particular race weekend, and promoting other simultaneous events (such as the Olympics).

Often several drivers sported related paint schemes simultaneously.

== Popular themes ==
Custom paint schemes frequently feature special events, and often include the following:

- An associate sponsor becomes the primary sponsor for selected races.
  - Often, if that associate sponsor is sponsoring the race, they will have primary sponsorship for that race.
- Sports teams (especially during special promotions)
  - During the 2001 MBNA Cal Ripken Jr. 400, the MBNA-sponsored No. 18 driven by Bobby Labonte drove a special Ripken-themed Pontiac Grand Prix. The Baltimore Orioles game that night was scheduled as Ripken's last home game until games were rescheduled because of the September 11 terrorist attacks. Ripken was grand marshal, started the race, and the race winner was to attend that game.
  - At the 2007 Lenox Industrial Tools 300, Carl Edwards used a Boston Red Sox-based car in celebration of Jack Roush partnering with Fenway Sports Group, headquartered in New England. The next year, David Ragan had a Bosox-based car.
  - InBev, the sponsor of the George Gillett-owned No. 9 Ford Fusion driven by Kasey Kahne, fielded a white car with a mountainous motif featuring the Olympic rings as part of the Belgian brewer's sponsorship of the United States Olympic team at the 2010 Winter Olympics. This paint scheme was used only for the races that were held during the length of the Olympic Games.
- Charities
  - During the 2010 All-Star race at Charlotte Motor Speedway, Dale Earnhardt Jr. ran a special paint scheme featuring the JR Foundation Logo on the hood, to commemorate this occasion. The design was reintroduced for the 2012 All-Star race.
  - The Home Depot often fielded a Kaboom-themed car for Joey Logano and Tony Stewart during their tenures with Joe Gibbs Racing.
  - Lowe's fields a "Power of Pride" car with the USO as a benefactor.
  - Dale Jarrett raced a "reverse" paint scheme in 1999 where his entire car's colour scheme was reversed for breast cancer research.
- Cartoon Characters
  - The Muppets were featured on a special series during a 2002 race at the Chicagoland Speedway.
  - The Looney Tunes were used as part of a promotion with the September race at Richmond International Raceway with the Chevrolet Monte Carlo 400 in 2001 and 2002.
- Rock Bands
  - During the time that Chevrolet sponsored the Federated Auto Parts 400 at Richmond International Raceway, some of the cars featured paint schemes based on popular rock bands.
  - 3 Doors Down has also been featured on several NASCAR cars before with Dale Earnhardt Jr. in 2008 for the NASCAR Sprint All Star Race and Tony Stewart in the Nationwide Series in 2003 for a race at Michigan International Speedway.

== Movie themes ==
The use of movie-themed cars is viewed as being perfectly suited to promotion through the use of special paint schemes due to the short-term nature of a movie's box office run.

Often, a sponsor is involved in a movie, and to promote the movie, they will deal with the movie producers to have their car painted to reflect the movie. Other times, a film studio will work with a driver to have the movie theme.

=== List of notable movie themes ===
- Toy Story (2, and 3)
- The Passion of the Christ: An advertisement for this movie was placed on the hood of Bobby Labonte's car at the 2004 Daytona 500
- Terminator 3: Rise of the Machines: Special paint scheme was driven once by Jamie McMurray
- Hulk Special full green paint scheme was driven once by Bobby Labonte (also featured on NASCAR Thunder 2004)
- Shrek (2, and The Third): For the former, special paint schemes were driven by Bobby Labonte and Tony Stewart at the 2004 Coca-Cola 600. For Shrek the Third, special paint schemes were used in 2007 by David Gilliland and Tony Raines.
- Shark Tale
- The SpongeBob SquarePants Movie: Jimmie Johnson & Kyle Busch drove this scheme in a fall Busch race at Lowe's in 2004.
- I Now Pronounce You Chuck and Larry: Kasey Kahne in the 2007 Pepsi 400
- Batman Forever: Bill Elliott drove such a promotion paint job in 1995.
- Jurassic Park: Bobby Labonte and Tony Stewart at several 2001 races, as well as Jeff Gordon in the 1997 All-Star Race. Gordon's 1997 All-Star Race winner is known as "T-Rex" that dominated the race and was effectively banned by NASCAR afterwards.
- Indiana Jones and the Kingdom of the Crystal Skull (NASCAR and IRL special paint schemes). Kyle Busch won the Dodge Challenger 500 in 2008 with the movie on the car.
- Click: Driven by Kasey Kahne to victory at Michigan in 2006.
- Herbie: Fully Loaded: Special paint scheme was driven by Dale Jarrett in 2005 at Infineon.
- The Dark Knight Rises: Dale Earnhardt Jr. drove and won the 2012 Quicken Loans 400 at Michigan in a car painted to promote The Dark Knight Rises.
- Star Wars: Episode III – Revenge of the Sith: This promotional paint job was used by Jeff Gordon at the 2005 Aaron's 499 at Talladega, which he won.
- Minions (film): In the 2015 Quaker State 400 at Kentucky Speedway, Carl Edwards drove the paint scheme to promote the Despicable Me spinoff movie.
- Batman v Superman: Dawn of Justice: In the 2016 Auto Club 400, Dale Earnhardt Jr. (Batman) and Jimmie Johnson (Superman) drive specially themed cars. Johnson won with his Superman theme.
- Cars 3: Kyle Larson drove the paint scheme in 2017 to promote the movie. He won the race at Michigan with this scheme. Clint Bowyer ran a Cars 3 scheme at Sonoma 2 weeks later as well, finishing 2nd.

== Throwback themes ==
Following trends in other sports, "throwback" paint schemes have also gained popularity in recent years, celebrating past accomplishments of well-known drivers.

=== List of notable throwback themes ===
- Harry Gant
  - For the 1994 Hooters 500, his final race, the car was based on a 1981 paint scheme with Burt Reynolds and Hal Needham.
- Darrell Waltrip
  - To celebrate 25 years since his first Winston Cup race (1972), during the 1997 season, he had cars painted to resemble different cars during his career. A special chrome car was also designed.
  - Has been the subject of various throwback designs by various teams, most notably Hendrick Motorsports (the team where he won his Daytona 500), though none of the Hendrick throwbacks reflected on his time at Hendrick.
  - For his last full-time race of his broadcast career, Ricky Stenhouse, Jr. and Denny Hamlin drove cars based on Waltrip liveries from his 1992 Southern 500 win.
- Jeff Gordon
  - In celebrating his distinguished career at the 2004 Nextel All-Star Challenge, his car was painted to resemble the 1992–2000 original DuPont "Rainbow Warriors," complete with the DuPont logo and "Automotive Finishes" on the side of the car, instead of the "DUPONT" design on the sides used from 2001-12 (the last race with DuPont; those logos belong to Dow as of 2017). Axalta, the successor company to DuPont Performance Coatings (spun off in 2013), ran the same 1992-2000 livery with the current Axalta logo and text on the cars at the 2015 Irwin Tools Night Race for his final full-time season. The livery was again used in 2018 by Hendrick Motorsports with current No. 24 driver William Byron at Darlington, which is the series' retro round.
  - To celebrate the debut of Pepsi Throwback, Gordon drove in a replica of Waltrip's 1983 "Pepsi Challenger" at the 2009 Aaron's 499, which was involved in an early crash on lap 8. Ironically, Waltrip did not drive the yellow Pepsi Challenger design in that spring Talladega event during the 1983 season, instead opting for a white design. (Pepsi used the yellow Pepsi Challenger livery for other motorsport teams at the time. most notably All American Racers in CART and Don Prudhomme in NHRA.)
  - At the 2016 Darlington retro round, he drove a Buddy Baker "Grey Ghost" scheme. The 2016 Gordon Darlington car became a theme Dale Earnhardt Jr. drove at the 2017 October Martinsville race, except it used contemporary logos.
  - At the 2019 Darlington Xfinity retro round, Michael Annett and sponsor Pilot Flying J had a 1992 Bill Davis Racing Baby Ruth Ford based livery on the JR Motorsports No. 1 Chevrolet. Despite the retro scheme, the car used current logos, including the Baby Ruth (which is being redone after its new owners, Ferrero Group) and Pilot Flying J logos.
- Jimmie Johnson
  - In 2018, to commemorate the final races of Lowe's Home Improvement Warehouse with Johnson and Hendrick Motorsports, the No. 48 Chevrolet Camaro used a series of throwback liveries. Those included the 2012 Kobalt car at Darlington (Hendrick's 200th win car), the 2001 debut car (Charlotte) at Phoenix, the rookie car from 2002 at Homestead.
  - In 2019, at the Darlington round, a Nelson & Nelson Racing Chevrolet Thunder off-road truck livery from his days driving off-road racing was used.
  - In 2020, during his final season, Hendrick Motorsports worked three Johnson schemes into the throwback round while Johnson himself drove a scheme designed to celebrate the sport's three seven-time champions.
    - William Byron drove Liberty University-sponsored car with a livery designed to be the 2013 Holden Commodore used to win the All-Star Race.
    - Chase Elliott drove a NAPA Auto Parts Camaro designed to resemble Johnson's 2009 Cup Series winning Chevrolet Impala.
    - Alex Bowman drove a Chevrolet designed to resemble Johnson's 2006 Cup Series winning Chevrolet Monte Carlo (his first championship season).
- Molson Coors (all brands)
  - Bill Elliott drove the 2005 Bud Shootout with Chip Ganassi Racing in a No. 39 Coors Dodge with 1985-88 era Coors livery.
  - During Rusty Wallace's "Last Call" tour in 2005, one of his cars featured the 1991–1995 Miller Genuine Draft black and gold paint scheme, complete with graphics replete of that era.
  - At the 2015 Pure Michigan 400, Team Penske had Brad Keselowski, who now drove the Miller Lite Ford, drive the car in the Miller Genuine Draft livery as part of the 25 years of Miller and Penske celebration. The same design was used at the 2017 Rebel 500.
  - At the Rebel 500 weeks later, Keselowski's car reflected the 1983 Miller High Life Bobby Allison livery from the Southern 500 win (the last Labor Day race; in 1984, the race moved to Sunday) and the ensuing Championship season.
  - At the 2018 Darlington retro round, the 1990 livery was used.
- Mark Martin
  - During the 2005 "Salute to You" tour, cars were painted to reflect various stages of Martin's career.
  - Roush Fenway Keselowski Racing has used various liveries inspired by Martin's career.
  - Valvoline, which has been affiliated as of 2014 with Hendrick Motorsports, and Martin have authorised schemes based on his Valvoline cars at Hendrick. Alex Bowman will drive one such scheme at the 2022 retro round.
- Chevron Corporation
  - Prior to pulling out in 2007, Chevron's Texaco Havoline brand had featured special schemes to celebrate the brand's past. Their most notable special scheme was the 1987 Ranier-Lundy "Battlestar" scheme of the late Davey Allison, which debuted at the 1997 Coca-Cola 600 and was later used in the DieHard 500 at the Talladega Superspeedway.
- Mountain Dew
  - The 1981–82 Mountain Dew Championship Seasons of Darrell Waltrip has been used at various times for Hendrick Motorsports liveries in Sprint Cup and Nationwide Series cars.
- Richard Childress Racing
  - During the 2004 UAW-GM Quality 500, to celebrate 35 years of Richard Childress Racing, the team ran three throwback schemes, with designs based on Childress schemes from the team's first win in 1983, the team's famed 1987 championship, and 1995 silver car).
- Dale Earnhardt Jr.
  - Earnhardt raced two throwbacks in 2006. The first was dedicated to his father at the 2006 Aaron's 499, using a black and silver paint scheme reminiscent of his father's Goodwrench cars. The second ran at the 2006 3M Performance 400 using a cream-colored design, similar to his late grandfather Ralph Earnhardt's 1956 Sportsman championship. The latter car had authentic-looking "#8" graphics from 1956, and Dale Jr's sponsor Budweiser added 1956-era Budweiser logos.
  - During the 2008 NASCAR Sprint All-Star Race, Earnhardt raced a car painted similar to Buddy Baker's "Grey Ghost" Oldsmobile 442 that won the 1980 Daytona 500 and set a race record that still stands.
  - Various regular schemes during Earnhardt's career at Hendrick Motorsports have influence from past cars. A later-era Baker Oldsmobile 88 scheme (Crisco) was flipped for his 2014-15 Nationwide livery, while the vertical stripes on a 1981 Wrangler scheme from his father are featured in the Windows 10 design in 2015. TaxSlayer (his father's Wrangler, 1986–87) and Axalta (Xfinity Oreo) all will have influence from past cars in 2016.
  - At the Rebel 500 retro round in 2017, his final full-time Monster Energy NASCAR Cup Series season in 2017, his 1998 Xfinity Series championship livery was used with current Nationwide decals.
  - For the October 2017 Martinsville race, the Jeff Gordon Nationwide #88 scheme, except with current-era Nationwide logos, was used. (Gordon's car carried the retro logos because it was used at Darlington.)
  - For his final scheduled Monster Energy NASCAR Cup Series race, his 1999 scheme was used as the basis with current Axalta logos as part of a promotion with Axalta's introduction of Cromax EZ paint. It was also the last race in the Series for the Holden VF Commodore.
  - For the 2018 Xfinity Series round at Darlington, Tyler Reddick, then driving for Earnhardt, used an Old Milwaukee livery inspired by Tim Richmond's Cup car in 1983–85, fielded by Raymond Beadle, whose son Ryan spearheaded the design as the general counsel for JR Motorsports.
  - For his 2019 Xfinity Series start at Darlington, he and sponsor Unilever arranged a livery based on a vintage car his father drove to his first Cup start in 1975, with approval of Norman Negre (son of the car owner).
  - Various JR Motorsports cars use liveries inspired by his career during the Darlington round.
- Chevrolet
  - During the August 2007 Nextel Cup weekend at Michigan International Speedway, the cars of 11 Team Chevy drivers were decorated with special paint schemes commemorating the 50th anniversary of the 1957 Chevrolet. The cars driven by Ward Burton, Dale Earnhardt Jr., Jeff Gordon, Jimmie Johnson, Mark Martin, Casey Mears, Paul Menard, Tony Raines, Martin Truex Jr., Scott Wimmer and J.J. Yeley all sported cues from the '57 Chevy's memorable design while J.J. Yeley's No. 18 Monte Carlo SS displayed a throwback Interstate Batteries logo.
- Darlington Raceway
  - From 2015 to 2020, the Goodyear 400 was moved from its traditional spring date to September, where the fall race (the Southern 500; the lineagnote that the history of the current Darlington race dates to the lineage of the 1957 Rebel 300) was held from 1950-2003 until it moved to November in 2004 and eliminated as a result of the Ferko lawsuit, replaced by the AAA Texas 500 at the Texas Motor Speedway a year; it was restored as the 2020 The Real Heroes 400 and 2020 Toyota 500km before the 2021 schedule changes. Various teams unveiled throwback and special paint schemes as part of a promotion with the track. The weekend has become an annual retro weekend, initially for liveries, but since 2024 has become a family reunion theme as NASCAR Alumni Weekend".
    - For 2021, with the restoration of two Cup meetings at Darlington, the race was lineally returned to the spring, and the Throwback weekend moved to the spring. The fall date will become a playoff-oriented round.
  - Some NASCAR Hall of Fame drivers have had multiple schemes from their career influence multiple drivers in the same race. Two teams—Wood Brothers (1976 NASCAR season) and Hendrick Motorsports (1979 Talladega 500), for example, in 2016 use David Pearson liveries on their cars.
- Driver Memorials
  - Following the 2013 death of Jason Leffler in a sprint car race, Denny Hamlin (who succeeded Leffler at Joe Gibbs Racing in 2005) had his car wrapped to resemble Leffler's 2005 livery for the 2013 Quicken Loans 400 at Michigan International Speedway.
  - Following the December 2025 death of Greg Biffle and his family in a plane crash, RFK Racing drivers Brad Keselowski, Chris Buescher, and Ryan Preece raced liveries and fonts based on Biffle's at the 2026 Goodyear 400 at Darlington Raceway, which was Alumni Weekend.
  - Following the May 2026 death of Kyle Busch, at least two NASCAR Cup Series teams announced their use of Busch throwbacks.
    - Ricky Stenhouse, Jr. raced a throwback NOS Energy design at the 2026 Cracker Barrel 400 at Nashville Superspeedway.
    - Ty Gibbs was announced in a statement by Mars and Busch's widow on August 13, 2026 that a Busch throwback inspired by photographs of Busch's wins with selected Mars-sponsored cars (does not include his Hendrick Motorsports cars that carried current Mars products) forming the core of the No. 54 M&M's retro-livery Toyota at the 2026 Bass Pro Shops Volunteer 500 at Bristol Motor Speedway.

=== Response to throwback themes ===
After Ernie Irvan put the throwback "Battlestar" on the pole at the 1997 DieHard 500, fan reaction forced Robert Yates Racing to consider having the "Battlestar" design at Talladega for the rest of the team's association with Texaco. When Chevron (who had bought Texaco) switched to Chip Ganassi Racing, fan reaction forced the sponsor to revert to the old Yates-era 1994-2000 design after Chevron changed the paint scheme in 2001.

Liz Allison (Davey's widow) told the media in announcing the 2003 Battlestar old fans would be cheering heavily when they see the classic design returning for the race, and warned Ganassi driver Jamie McMurray that if he won the race in the Battlestar, "You better bar the door because the Allisons are taking over. We're really excited and very touched (by Chevron's generosity in remembering a legend)."

== Military paint schemes ==
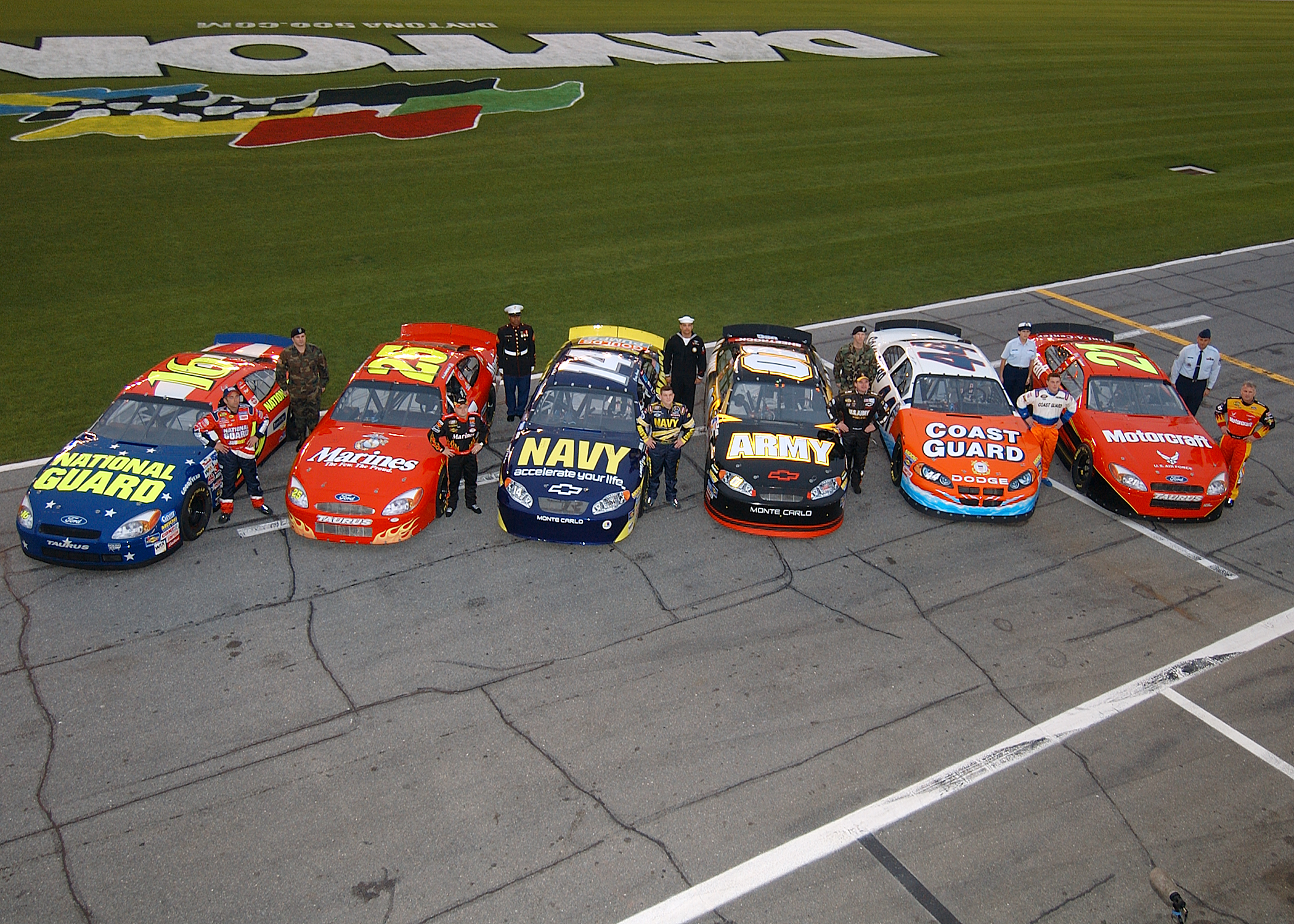
The military-sponsored cars of six drivers in 2004. From left to right: Greg Biffle (National Guard), Bobby Hamilton Jr. (Marines), Casey Atwood (Navy), Joe Nemechek (Army), Justin Labonte (Coast Guard), Ricky Rudd (Air Force)

New variations on the military paint schemes have also been used throughout the years. The United States Army began sponsoring the No. 01 car owned by MB2 Motorsports full-time in 2003. For major anniversaries, the cars used a special camouflage design. The Army then went to Dale Earnhardt, Inc. for two seasons before joining Stewart Haas Racing in 2009 and was the primary sponsor of Ryan Newman's No. 39 until 2012.

Although the schemes were not military-based, several cars used patriotic paint schemes for the 2001 MBNA Cal Ripken Jr. 400 at Dover, the first race after the September 11 attacks.

Often die-cast replicas of the paint scheme cars are produced for the collector market.

== Differences between special and alternating paint schemes ==
With the economics of the sport dictating higher expenses, some sponsors have decided to share sponsor space with other sponsors, leading to two "regular" designs which alternate, such as Richard Childress Racing, where all three teams have multiple alternating primary sponsors. In 2009, the No. 29 team had Shell and Hershey, while the No. 31 had Caterpillar, AstraZeneca, and Lenox Industrial Tools, and the #07 has Jack Daniel's, DirecTV, and BB&T as their three sponsors. Other sponsors have decided to promote different products with their sponsor dollars, such as Mars (M&M's, Snickers, Skittles, Wrigley's, Pedigree, Banfield Pet Hospitals), Lowe's (two schemes, one standard which can be configured to promote professional services or have the regular logo, and one Kobalt Tools), and Kellogg's with the standard Kellogg's and Cheez-It snacks (a Kellogg's product) schemes, and FedEx, which uses five different schemes with color differences to promote four different brands—Express, Ground, Freight, and Kinko's. (A fifth scheme was used in 2005 at Darlington, and is a special scheme, to promote the St. Jude Hospital they support in Memphis.) Those are not "special" schemes, but are co-primary schemes to promote various products by a sponsor who may be willing to use the broadcasts to promote their wide variety of products.

The sheer number of special paint schemes has led to criticism that they are no longer "special" at all. However, it should be differentiated between alternating sponsors, different products on cars (especially promotions for special products), and the true special paint schemes, which promote special events.

== IndyCar Series ==
Though not as widespread as NASCAR, cars in the IndyCar Series have also participated in special paint schemes. Most that have been used have featured a "retro" or tribute paint scheme, depicting a notable car from the past. In most cases, the sponsors are not the same but carry the current sponsors' decals on the classic liveries.

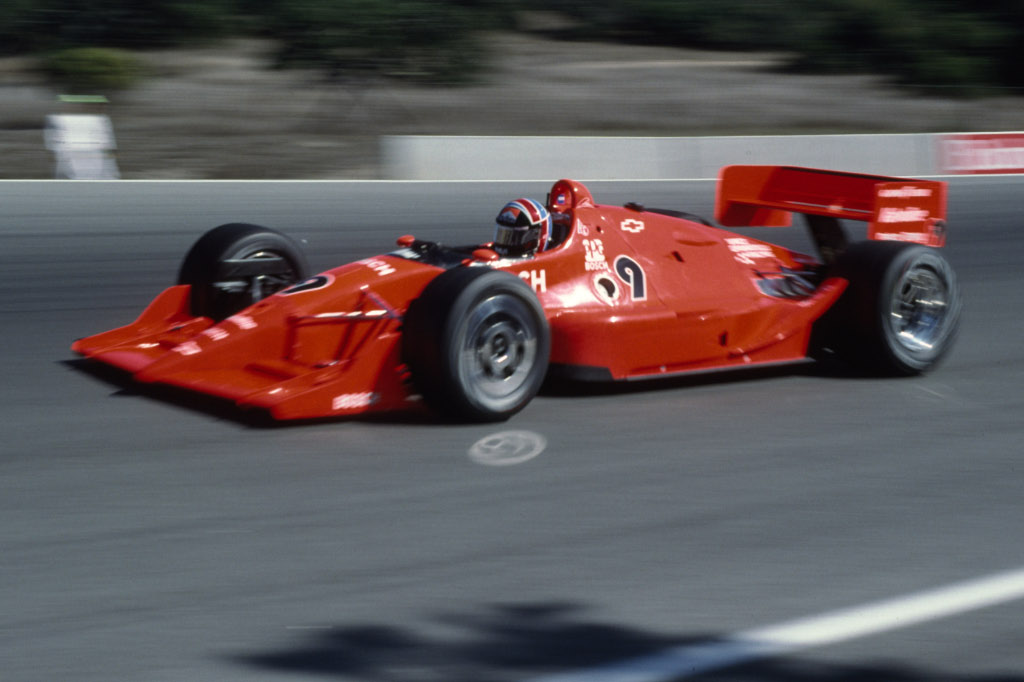
- Arie Luyendyk in 1991, driving for Vince Granatelli.
  1987–1991: Vince Granatelli and later UNO/Granatelli entries sported a "throwback" paint scheme which featured a day-glow orange, similar to that of the STP Turbine cars of the late 60s, and other Andy Granatelli entries of the early 1970s.

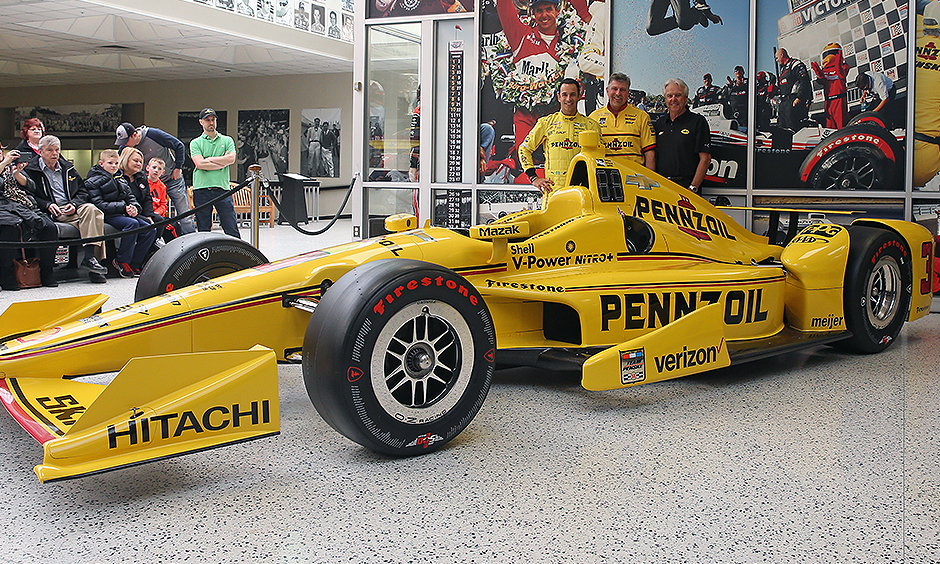
Unveiling of Hélio Castroneves' entry in the 2016 Indianapolis 500.

- 2000 Indianapolis 500: Hometown rookie driver and co-owner Andy Hillenburg fielded a "throwback" entry named the Sumar Special, a gesture to the car driven by Pat O'Connor which won the pole position in 1957.
- 2001 Indianapolis 500: Billy Boat fielded a "throwback" paint scheme that resembled "Calhoun," the car driven by 1962 pole position winner Parnelli Jones. Boat's car was nicknamed "Calhoun II."
- 2007 Indianapolis 500: Ryan Briscoe's entry at Luczo Dragon Racing was painted in a "retro" paint schemes to resemble Rick Mears' 1988 Indy 500 winning car. It was the first of a small trend of similar instances.
- 2008 Indianapolis 500: Marco Andretti's car was painted to promote the movie Indiana Jones and the Kingdom of the Crystal Skull, and his racing suit was designed to resemble Indiana Jones's outfit.
- 2009 Indianapolis 500: Rahal Letterman Racing's DAFCA Special for driver Oriol Servià was painted to resemble Dan Gurney's 1968 Olsonite Eagle, which finished second in the 1968 Indianapolis 500.
- 2009 Edmonton Indy: Will Power drove a Penske Racing Verizon entry with the retro Penske Truck Rental paint job, resembling Al Unser's 1987 Indy 500 livery.
- 2010 Cafes do Brasil 300 (Homestead): Sarah Fisher drove in her final INDYCAR race a special Komen pink Dollar General car (as opposed to the normal yellow and black), in a partnership with Susan G. Komen for the Cure to promote Breast Cancer awareness month.
- 2011: Hélio Castroneves AAA-sponsored car resembled the classic "Gould Charge" paint scheme fielded by Rick Mears in the early 1980s. It also resembled Paul Tracy's 1992 Mobil 1-sponsored machine.
- 2014, 2016, and 2018 Indy 500s: Hélio Castroneves Pennzoil-sponsored car had a special paint scheme, dubbed the "Yellow Submarine" after Rick Mears car. Helio drove the car in 2014 to second, losing by 0.06 seconds to Ryan Hunter-Reay.

== Art cars ==
German manufacturer BMW has a tradition of competing with arts cars which started in the 1975 24 Hours of Le Mans. Artists such as David Hockney, Roy Lichtenstein, Robert Rauschenberg, Frank Stella and Andy Warhol have contributed to the project. Other teams have done similar liveries, such as Aston Martin Racing and OAK Racing in the 2013 24 Hours of Le Mans.

== See also ==
- Flame job
