= RS Americas =

US-based distributor of electronic components and electromechanical products

RS Americas, Inc.

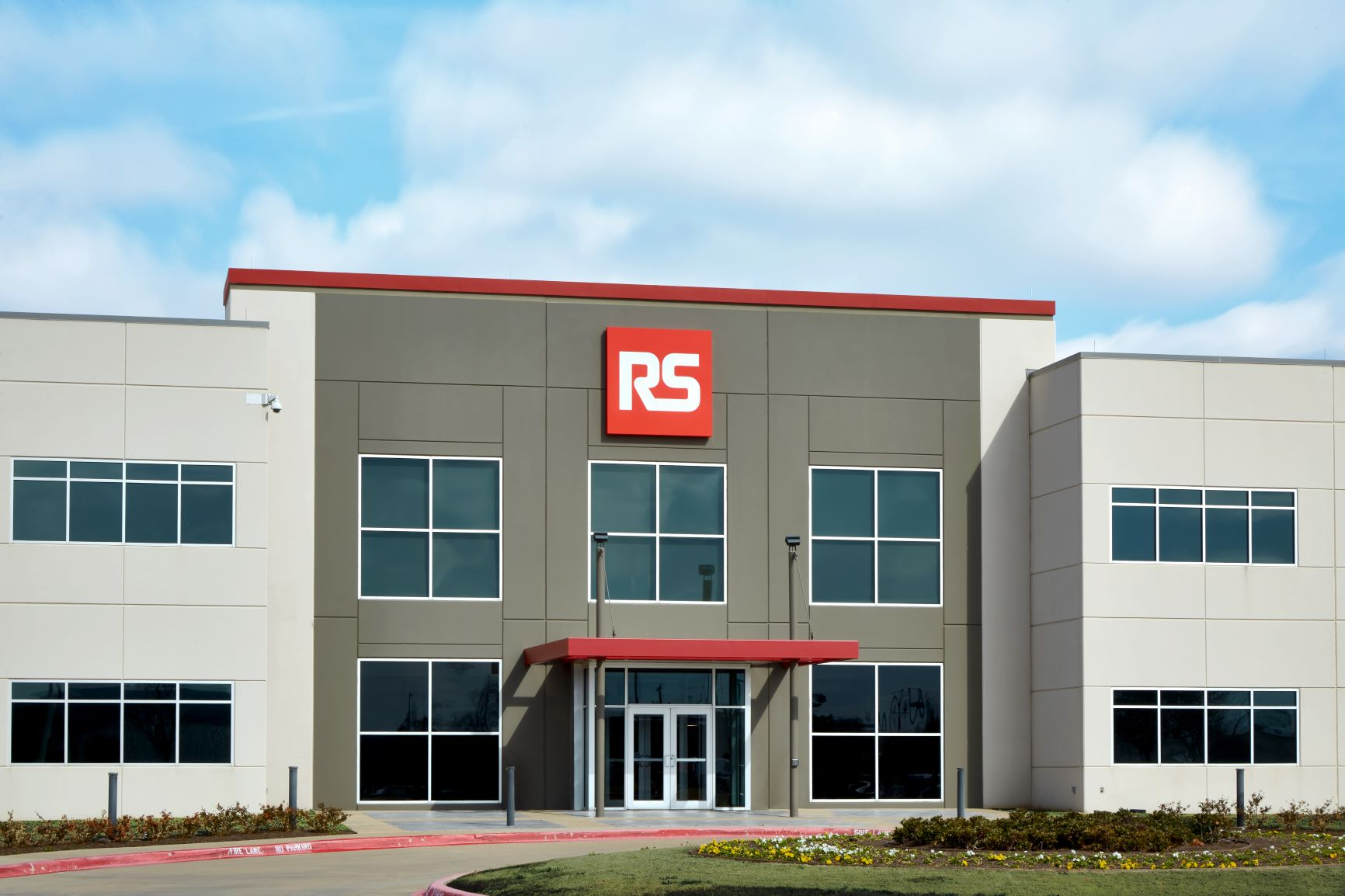
- RS Americas Headquarters
- Founded: 1928; 98 years ago
- Founded at: Chicago, IL
- Type: Subsidiary
- Headquarters: Fort Worth, Texas
- Location: United States
- Services: Electronics and automation control distribution
- President: Doug Moody
- Parent organization: RS Group
- Website: us.rs-online.com

RS Americas, Inc. (formerly Allied Electronics & Automation) is a United States-based omni-channel provider of product and service solutions for designers, builders, and maintainers of industrial equipment and operations. They are part of London-based RS Group, plc (formerly Electrocomponents, plc), an FTSE 100 global leader in the omnichannel distribution of products and services for industrial equipment and operations.

== History ==
The Americas division of RS Group was founded in 1928 in Chicago, Illinois by Simon "Sy" Wexler as Allied Radio, the radio parts distribution arm of Columbia Radio Corporation (also founded by Wexler in 1921).

In 1970, the Tandy Corporation, Radio Shack's former parent company, purchased Allied Radio, the consumer division, along with Allied Electronics, the industrial division.

In 1999, Allied became the North American division of Electrocomponents. In 2016, Allied expanded into South America with a full-service office in Santiago, Chile, and in 2017, grew its sales presence in Mexico. In October 2022, Allied announced they would be changing their name to RS in Q1 2023 as part of an overall rebranding strategy to establish a better connection across RS Group’s products and services. On February 6, 2023, the name change became official.

== Operations ==
RS Americas, Inc is headquartered in Fort Worth, Texas. It has a 560,000 square foot distribution facility.

== External list ==
- RS Americas website
- RS Group homepage
