= Post-silicon validation =

Post-silicon validation and debug is the last step in the development of a semiconductor integrated circuit.

== Pre-silicon process ==
During the pre-silicon process, engineers test devices in a virtual environment with sophisticated simulation, emulation, and formal verification tools. In contrast, post-silicon validation tests occur on actual devices running at-speed in commercial, real-world system boards using logic analyzer and assertion-based tools.

== Reasoning ==
Developing a new integrated circuit involves non-recurring engineering (NRE) costs, which for large semiconductor companies can amount to millions of dollars per design. These costs are incurred before volume production begins, so a chip that does not meet its specification, or that reaches the market late, reduces the return on that investment. In consumer markets with short product cycles, a delay of a few weeks has been estimated to cost tens of millions of dollars. Post-silicon validation tests manufactured chips against their specification before volume production, with the aim of finding such defects early.

== Validation ==
Chips comprising 500,000 logic elements serve as the processing system inside cell phones, MP3 players, computer printers and peripherals, digital television sets, medical imaging systems, transportation safety and comfort components, and building management systems, among others. The manufacturer must ensure that the device is validated due to its consumer proliferation or mission-critical application.

The best way to achieve high confidence is to leverage the pre-silicon verification work — which can comprise as much as 30% of the overall cost of the implementation — and use that knowledge in the post-silicon system. Today, much of this work is done manually, which partially explains the high costs associated with system validation. However, there are some tools that have been recently introduced to automate post-silicon system validation.

== Observability ==
Simulation-based design environments enjoy the tremendous advantage of nearly perfect observability, meaning the designer can see any signal at nearly any time. They suffer, however, from the restricted amount of data they can generate during post-silicon system validation. Many complicated devices indicate their problems only after days or weeks of testing, and they produce a volume of data that would take centuries to reproduce on a simulator. FPGA-based emulators, a well-established part of most implementation techniques, are faster than software simulators but will not deliver the comprehensive at-system-speed tests needed for device reliability.

Moreover, the problem of post-silicon validation is getting worse, as design complexity increases because of the terrific advances in semiconductor materials processing. The duration from prototype silicon — so-called "first silicon" — to volume production is increasing, and bugs do escape to the customers. The expense associated with IP-hardening is increasing. The industry today is focused on techniques that allow designers to better amortize their investment in pre-silicon verification to post-silicon validation. The best of these solutions enable affordable, scalable, automated, on-chip wire-scale visibility.

== Benefits ==
Post-silicon validation encompasses all that validation effort that is poured onto a system after the first few silicon prototypes become available, but before product release. While in the past most of this effort was dedicated to validating electrical aspects of the design, or diagnosing systematic manufacturing defects, today a growing portion of the effort focuses on functional system validation. This trend is for the most part due to the increasing complexity of digital systems, which limits the verification coverage provided by traditional pre-silicon methodologies. As a result, a number of functional bugs survive into manufactured silicon, and it is the job of post-silicon validation to detect and diagnose them so that they do not escape into the released system. The bugs in this category are often system-level bugs and rare corner-case situations buried deep in the design state space: since these problems encompass many design modules, they are difficult to identify with pre-silicon tools, characterized by limited scalability and performance.

Post-silicon validation, on the other hand, benefits from very high raw performance, since tests are executed directly on manufactured silicon. At the same time, it poses several challenges to traditional validation methodologies, because of the limited internal observability and difficulty of applying modifications to manufactured silicon chips. These two factors lead in turn to critical challenges in error diagnosis and correction.

== See also ==
- Electronic design automation
- List of EDA companies
- Design flow (EDA)
