= Silego =

Defunct American semiconductor company

Silego Technology Inc.
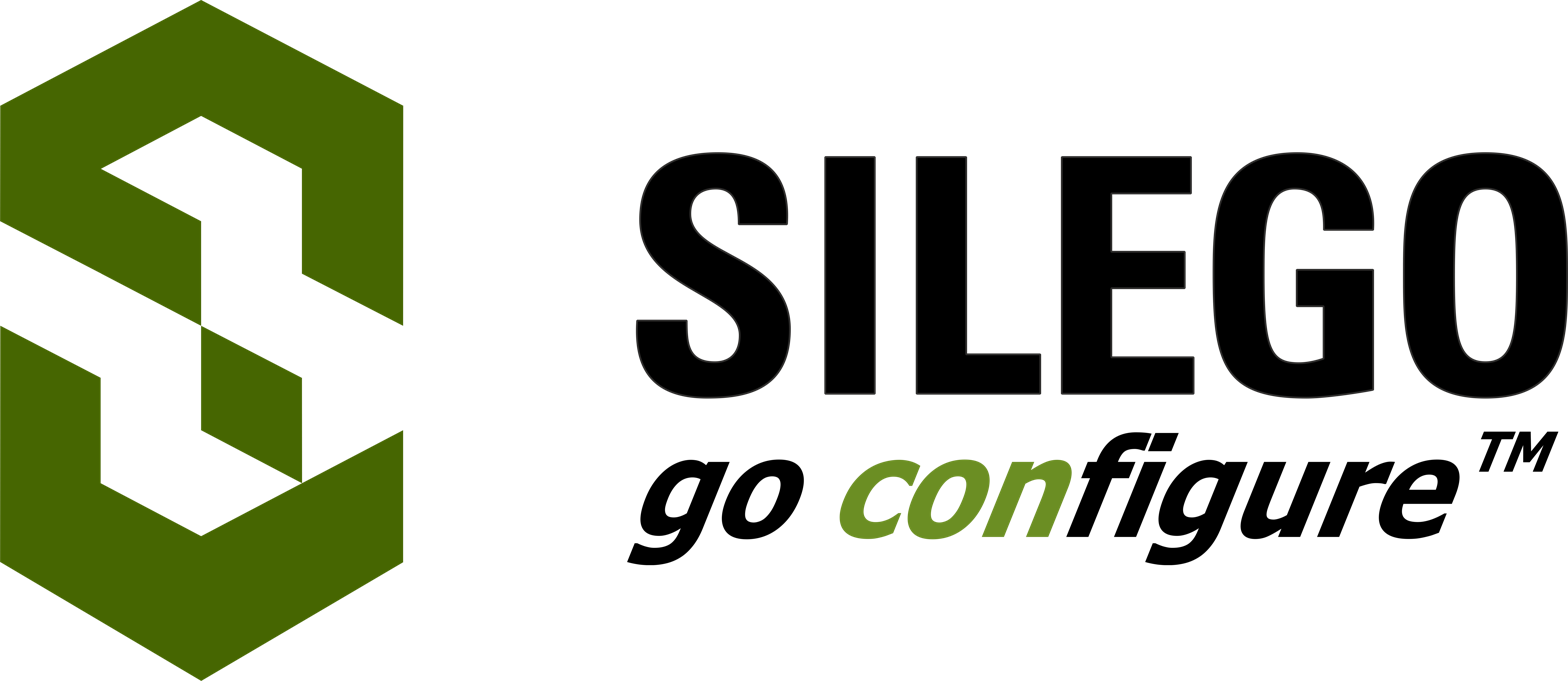
- Logo used until 2017-11-01
- Type: Private
- Industry: Semiconductors
- Founded: California, U.S. (2001)
- Fate: Acquired by Dialog Semiconductor
- Headquarters: Santa Clara, California, U.S.
- Number of locations: 3 Design Centers, 2 Operation Teams
- Owner: Dialog Semiconductor UK plc
- Number of employees: ▲235 (2017)
- Divisions: Programmable Mixed-signal Matrix; High-performance Integrated Power Switches and MOSFET Drivers; 32.768 kHz and MHz Clocks; BCID and QC 2.0
- Website: silego.com at the Wayback Machine (archived 2013-02-26)

Silego Technology Inc. was an independent Silicon Valley–based fabless semiconductor company until it was acquired by Dialog Semiconductor on 1 November 2017.

Its products and services were created to design and sell highly configurable power, logic, and timing mixed signal IC products described as CMICs (configurable mixed-signal IC products), they are now part of the Dialog Semiconductor portfolio. Silego was ranked the second-fastest growing semiconductor company in North America at the 2011 Deloitte Technology Fast 500 event held in Menlo Park, California. By August 2016, the company had shipped more than 2 billion CMICs.

== Products ==
- Programmable Mixed-signal Matrix: Dual Supply GreenPAK, GreenPAK with Power Switches, GreenPAK with Asynchronous State Machine (ASM), Micropower Operational Amplifiers.
- High-performance Integrated Power Switches and MOSFET drivers: HFET 1, GreenFET 3, GreenFET 1, CurrentPAK.
- 32.768 kHz and MHz clocks: GreenCLK 3, GreenCLK 2, GreenCLK 1, System & Server Clocks.
- BCID, QC 2.0: Fast Charge Identification.
