= China Electronics Corporation =

Chinese telecom company

China Electronic Corporation

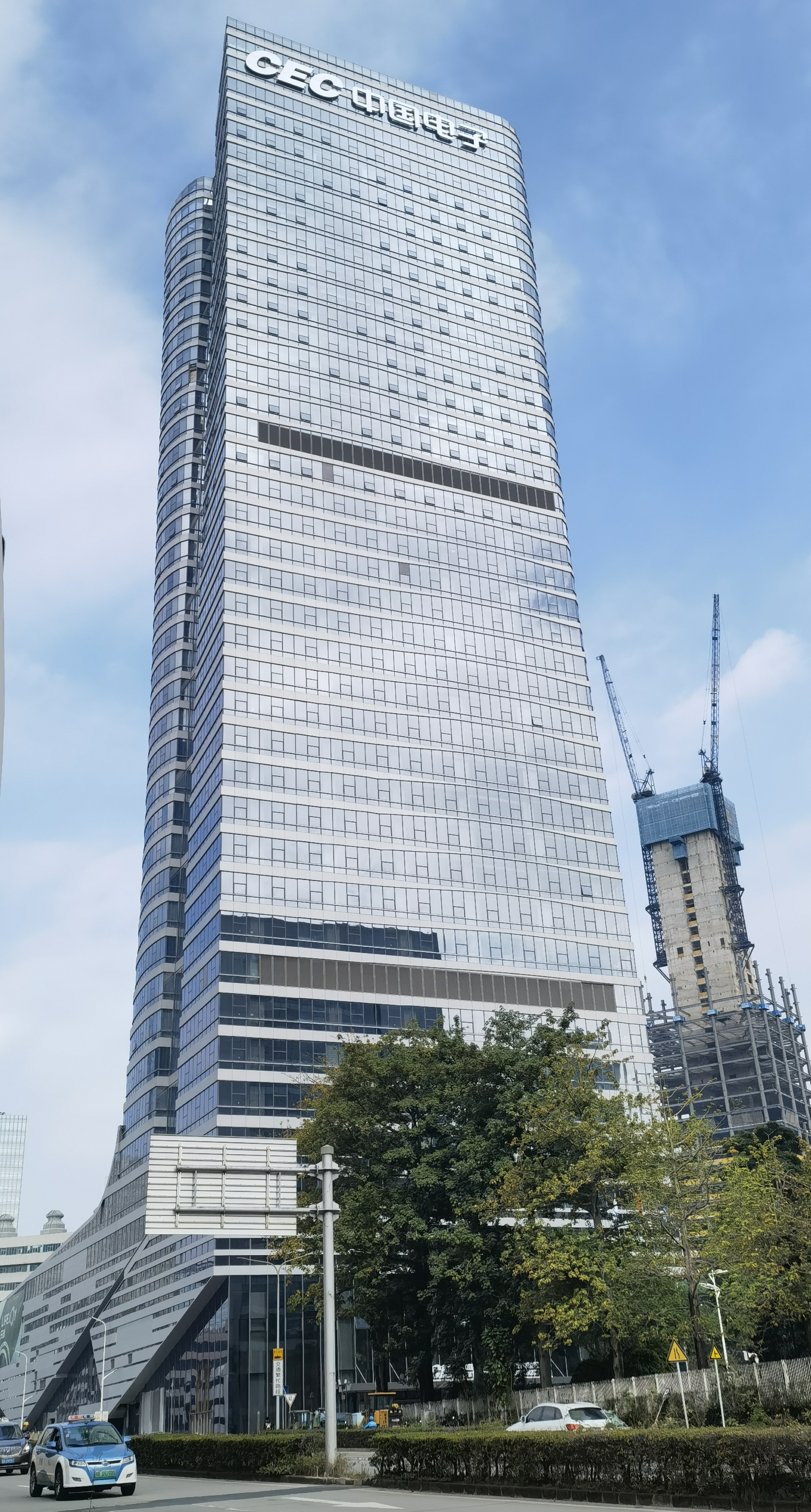
- Native name: 中国电子信息产业集团有限公司
- Type: State-owned
- Industry: Electronic information industry
- Predecessor: Enterprises under the Ministry of Industry and Information Technology
- Founded: 1989
- Headquarters: CEC GreatWall Tower A, Keyuan South Road, Nanshan District, Shenzhen, Guangdong, China
- Key people: Rui Xiaowu (Chairman); Zeng Yi (General manager)
- Products: Computer Software, Enterprise Software/applications
- Revenue: CN¥216.21 billion (2017)
- Net income: CN¥ 4.25 billion (2017)
- Owner: People's Republic of China
- Website: www.cec.com.cn

China Electronics Corporation (Chinese: 中国电子信息产业集团; pinyin: Zhōngguó diànzǐ xìnxī chǎnyè jítuán, CEC) is a Chinese state-owned company and one of the largest producers of telecom equipment in China for both civilian and military purposes.

== History ==
CEC acquired the mobile phone division of Philips in 2007. At the time, the Philips division had an annual revenue of 400 million euros and 240 employees. CEC received the right to sell mobile phones under Philips license.

Philips already moved its mobile phones production in China in 2001, when the production, research and development of mobile phones was taken by a joint-venture of Philips and China Electronics Corporation. Romania was the first country in the European Union where such mobile phones were sold since 2013, until then the phones were available only in the BRIC states (Brazil, Russia, India and China). In 2012, CEC acquired a stake in the Brazilian company H‑Buster, known for manufacturing car audio equipment, televisions, and computers. Founded in 1997 by Guilherme Ho Yi, H‑Buster experienced significant growth in the domestic market, becoming a major player in car audio systems and LCD televisions. The partnership with CEC aimed to strengthen local production and expand the product portfolio, leveraging the industrial facilities in the Manaus Free Trade Zone and the headquarters in Cotia, São Paulo. However, financial difficulties and a market downturn led H‑Buster to file for judicial recovery in 2013. Despite efforts to revive operations, the brand eventually ceased its activities in the following years.

=== U.S. investment prohibition ===
In August 2020, the United States Department of Defense published the names of companies with links to the People's Liberation Army operating directly or indirectly in the United States. CEC was included on the list. In November 2020, Donald Trump issued an executive order prohibiting any American company or individual from owning shares in companies that the U.S. Department of Defense has listed as having links to the People's Liberation Army, which included CEC.
