= SmartSpice =

SmartSpice is a commercial version of SPICE (Simulation Program with Integrated Circuit Emphasis) developed by Silvaco. SmartSpice is used to design complex analog circuits, analyze critical nets, characterize cell libraries, and verify analog mixed-signal designs. SmartSpice is compatible with popular analog design flows and foundry-supplied device models. It supports a reduced design space simulation environment. Among its usages in the electronics industry is dynamic timing analysis.

== Key features ==
- HSPICE-compatible netlists, models, analysis features, and results
- Can handle up to 400,000 active devices in 32-bit and 8 million active devices in 64-bit version
- Supports multiple threads for parallel operation
- Multiple solvers and stepping algorithms
- Collection of calibrated SPICE models for traditional technologies (bipolar, CMOS) and emerging technologies (e.g., TFT, SOI, HBT, FRAM)
- Provides an open model development environment and analog behavioral capability with Verilog-A option
- Supports the Cadence analog flow through OASIS
- Offers a transient non-Monte Carlo method to simulate the transient noise in nonlinear dynamic circuits

== Supported transistor models ==
- BJT/HBT: Gummel-Poon, Quasi-RC, VBIC, MEXTRAM, MODELLA, HiCUM
- MOSFET: LEVEL 1, LEVEL 2, LEVEL 3, BSIM1, BSIM3, BSIM4, BSIM5, MOS 11, PSP, MOS 20, EKV, HiSIM, HVMOS
- TFT: Amorphous and Polysilicon TFT models: Berkeley, Leroux, RPI
- SOI: Berkeley BSIM3SOI PD/DD/FD, UFS, LETISOI
- MESFET: Statz, Curtice I & II, TriQuint
- JFET: LEVEL 1, LEVEL 2
- Diode: Berkeley, Fowler-Nordheim, Philips JUNCAP/Level 500
- FRAM: Ramtron FCAP

== Supported input formats ==
Berkeley SPICE netlist, HSPICE netlist, W-element RLGC matrix files, S-parameter model files, Verilog-A and AMS, C/C++

== Supported output formats ==
Rawfiles, output listings, Analysis results, Measurement data, Waveforms (portable across unix/windows platforms)
