= DesignSpark PCB =

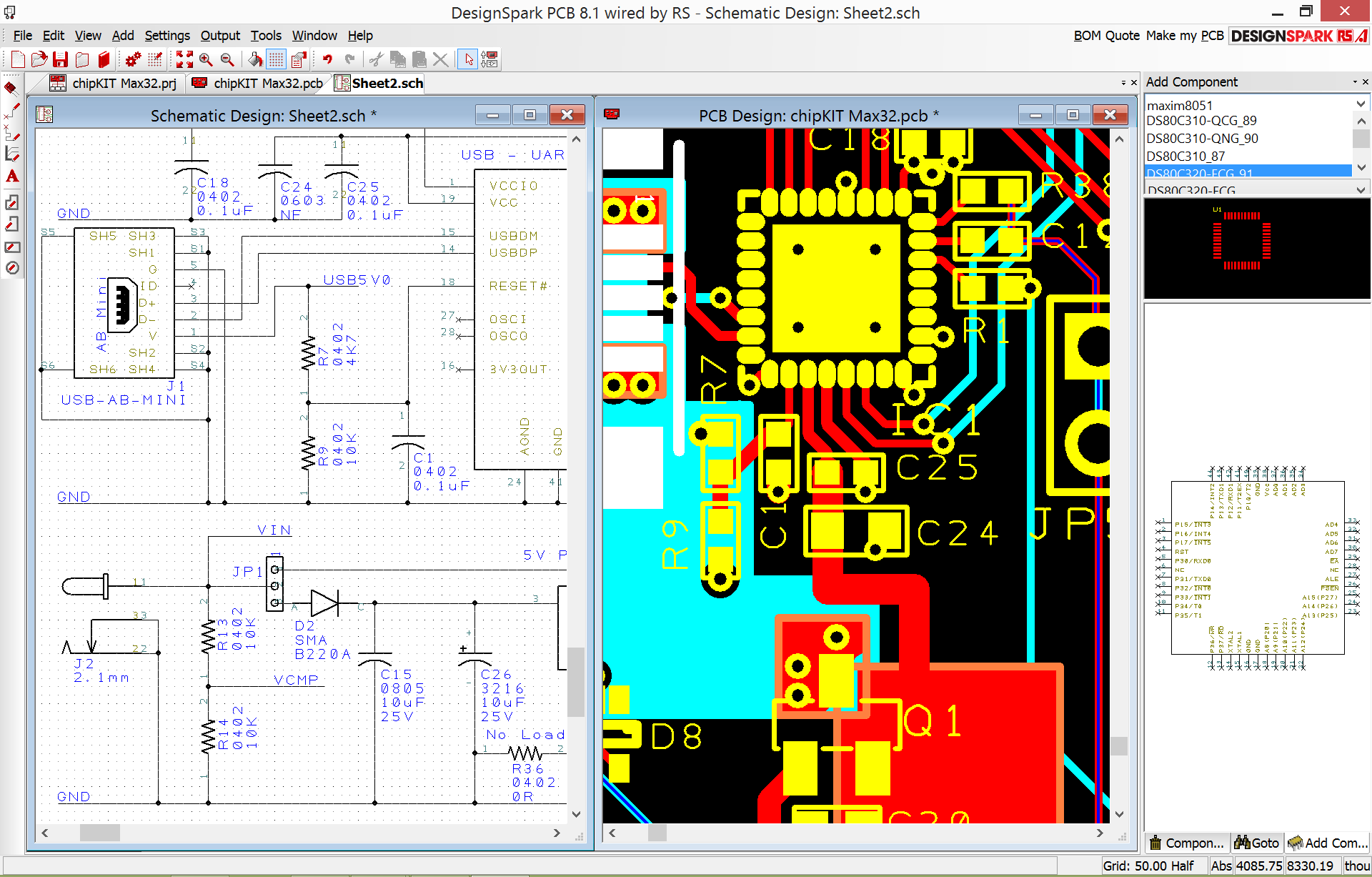
- Developer: RS Components
- Release: July 5, 2010
- Stable release: 13.0.3 / September 22, 2026; 26 days ago
- Operating system: Windows, Linux under Wine
- Available in: English
- Type: Electronic design automation
- License: Proprietary software
- Website: www.rs-online.com/designspark/pcb-software

DesignSpark PCB is an electronic design automation software package for schematic capture and printed circuit board (PCB) design. The software is available through a free registration-based tier, with additional features available through paid subscription plans. DesignSpark PCB supports unlimited schematic sheets and PCB layers and is aimed at design engineers.

== Background ==
DesignSpark PCB resulted from a collaboration between electronics distributor RS Components and EDA software developer 'Number One Systems', being a fork of their long-established EDA Easy-PC. Electronic design automation (EDA) software is a sub-class of computer-aided design (CAD) software.

== Projects ==
Projects are used in DesignSpark PCB to organise design files. A project can have an unlimited number of schematic sheets and one PCB layout file.

== Schematic capture ==
DesignSpark PCB has a Schematic editor. Schematics are used to draw up circuit diagrams and connections. A given project can have multiple schematic sheets that together combine to form the complete design.

There are some useful third party libraries that can be added.

== PCB layout ==
Schematics are translated to a PCB layout file with a PCB Wizard. A PCB layout editor is then used to refine the physical layout of the printed circuit board. A design may have several iterations before a finalised printed circuit board is passed for production.

== Manufacturing ==
DesignSpark PCB exports industry-standard Gerber and Excellon manufacturing files and includes bill-of-materials generation capabilities for production documentation. The software also supports mechanical design exchange through IDF export, enabling integration with MCAD workflows.

== Autorouter ==
DesignSpark PCB includes an auto-router which automatically places tracks between components on a PCB layout. Components can also be auto-placed.

== DesignSpark PCB Pro ==
DesignSpark PCB Pro
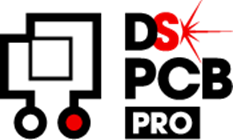

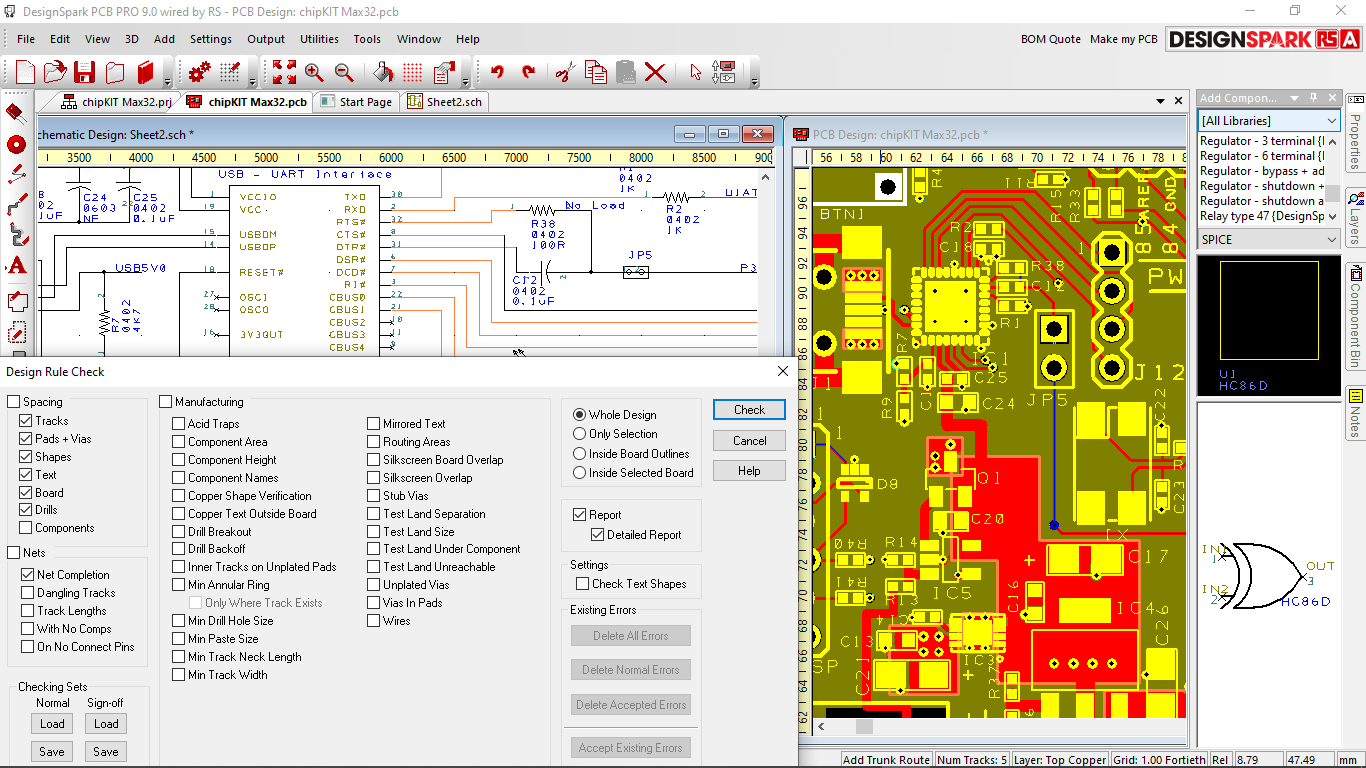
- Screenshot DesignSpark PCB Pro 9.0 displaying a sample schematic and PCB design.
- Developer: RS Components
- Release: October 2, 2019; 7 years ago

Final release(s)
- 10.0.1 / December 6, 2021; 4 years ago
- Operating system: Windows, Linux under Wine
- Platform: Desktop, Laptop
- Available in: English
- Type: Electronic design automation
- License: Proprietary software
- Website: www.rs-online.com/designspark/pcb-pro-software

DesignSpark PCB Pro was a paid upgrade from the free DesignSpark PCB software. It was aimed at professional electronic design engineers of SMEs with an expanded feature set compared to the free DesignSpark PCB software. It was discontinued in September 2022 and its features were merged into DesignSpark PCB as part of paid subscription plans.

=== Background ===
DesignSpark PCB Pro also resulted from a collaboration between electronics distributor RS Components and EDA software developer 'WestDev Ltd'.

=== Features ===
DesignSpark PCB Pro includes specialised tools to aid professionals with customising and managing large projects involving multi-layer PCBs. Noteworthy features referred to on the developer's website include:

- Blind and Buried Vias - to connect between different layers of a complex printed circuit board
- Fully configurable design rules editor and checker - to verify a circuit design and pass quality checks for production
- Hierarchical Schematic Design - split multi-sheet schematics into building blocks to make them readable and manageable
- Panel design editor - visualise and manage assembly of finished PCB designs prior to manufacturing
- Variant Manager - to specify different design variants to meet global market requirements
- Automatic shape-based and gridless router
- Advanced routing modes – trunk routing for differential pairs and buses, pull tight, auto mitre, and auto neck tracks
- Dual screen support
- Cross-hatch copper pours, teardrops, bullet, and asymmetric pad shapes are supported.

== See also ==
- Comparison of EDA Software
- DesignSpark Mechanical
