= Spectrum Software =

Software company in California, USA

- Type: Software
- Industry: Software
- Founded: February 1980
- Founder: Andy Thompson
- Defunct: July 4, 2019
- Headquarters: Sunnyvale, California, USA
- Website: Website archive

Spectrum Software was a software company based in California, whose main focus is electrical simulation and analysis tools, most notably the circuit simulator Micro-Cap. It was founded in February 1980 by Andy Thompson. Initially, the company concentrated on providing software for Apple II systems.

One of the earliest products was Logic Designer and Simulator. Released in June 1980, this product was the first integrated circuit editor and logic simulation system available for personal computers. In many ways it was the forerunner of the Micro-Cap products. Its primary goal was to provide a “circuit creation and simulation” environment for digital simulation.

In August 1981, the analog equivalent of the first program, Circuit Designer and Simulator, was released. Its integrated text editor created circuit descriptions for a simple, linear, analog simulator. September 1982 saw the release of the first Micro-Cap package as a successor to the Circuit Designer and Simulator. The name Micro-Cap was derived from the term Microcomputer Circuit Analysis Program.

As of July 4, 2019, the company has closed and the software is now free. In early 2023, their website went offline.
