= Nimbic =

- Type: Private
- Industry: EDA Software
- Founded: Bellevue, Washington (2006)
- Fate: Acquired by Mentor Graphics, which was later acquired by Siemens
- Headquarters: Mountain View, California, United States

Nimbic, Inc. (formerly Physware) was a company that developed electronic design automation (EDA) software. The company was founded in 2006 and was headquartered in Mountain View, California, United States.

Nimbic offered high speed 3D electromagnetic simulation solutions for signal integrity (SI), power integrity (PI), integrity to electromagnetic interference (EMI) and Simultaneous Switching Noise/Simultaneous Switching Output (SSN/SSO) Integrity. They also offered secure Cloud Computing solutions for electronic design.

In May 2014 Nimbic was acquired by Mentor Graphics, which was in turn acquired in 2017 by Siemens and rebranded Siemens EDA.

== Portfolio ==
Nimbic develops 3D broadband electromagnetic field extractors and simulators for signal integrity, power integrity, EMI Analysis and SSN/SSO Analysis. Their product range includes:

- nWave
- nApex
- nVolt
- nCloud

== History ==
Nimbic (formerly Physware) was founded in December 2006 by Dr. Vikram Jandhyala.

In May 2010, Physware was named "2010 Cool Vendor in Semiconductors" by Gartner.

Nimbiic was acquired by Mentor Graphics in 2014.
