= DAFCA =

DAFCA, Inc., or Design Automation for Flexible Chip Architecture was an EDA software company founded in 2003 and later acquired in 2008. DAFCA specialised in system-on chip (SoC) infrastructure, including post-silicon validation, debug, and in-system bring-up of integrated circuits. DAFCA's tools allow design teams to incorporate patented and compact reconfigurable instrumentation IP into their devices, pre-silicon, in order to observe, discover, and diagnose at-speed, in-silicon functional behavior.

The company was founded by Peter Levin and Miron Abramovici in 2003. At its inception, Levin served as its president and chief executive officer, Abramovici as its chief technology officer, and Al Dunlop as the vice president of engineering. The firm was based in Framingham, Massachusetts.

On October 30, 2008, DAFCA was acquired by Boston-based holding company Ceallaigh Group LLC. Sawblade Ventures, LLC (SbV) of Austin, Texas later acquired all technology rights, patents, intellectual property and software previously owned by DAFCA.
