= Configurable mixed-signal IC =

Configurable mixed-signal IC (abbreviated as CMIC) is a category of ICs comprising a matrix of analog and digital blocks which are configurable through programmable (OTP) non-volatile memory. The technology, in combination with its design software and development kits, allows immediate prototyping of custom mixed-signal circuits, as well as the integration of multiple discrete components into a single IC to reduce PCB cost, size and assembly issues.

== See also ==
- Field-programmable analog array
- Programmable system-on-chip
