= Dialog Semiconductor =

Anglo-German semiconductor company

Dialog Semiconductor Plc

- Dialog Semiconductor Corporate HQ in Reading
- Type: Subsidiary
- Industry: Electrical engineering
- Founded: 1985; 41 years ago
- Headquarters: Reading, United Kingdom (operational), London, United Kingdom (registered office)
- Key people: Rich Beyer (Chairman), Jalal Bagherli (CEO), Wissam Jabre (CFO), Mark Tyndall (SVP Corporate Development)
- Products: Semiconductors, integrated circuits
- Revenue: ▼US$1,376 million (2020)
- Operating income: ▼US$120.9 million (2020)
- Net income: ▼US$84.49 million (2020)
- Total assets: ▼US$2,121 million (2020)
- Total equity: ▲US$1,654 million (2020)
- Number of employees: 2,286 (2020)
- Parent: Renesas Electronics
- Website: renesas.com

Dialog Semiconductor Plc is an Anglo-German semiconductor-based system designer and manufacturer. The company is headquartered in the United Kingdom in Reading, with a global sales, R&D and marketing organization. Dialog creates highly integrated application-specific standard product (ASSP) and application-specific integrated circuit (ASIC) mixed-signal integrated circuits (ICs), optimised for smartphones, computing, Internet of Things devices, LED solid-state lighting (SSL), and smart home applications.

Dialog operates a fabless business model, but maintains its own test and physical laboratories in Kirchheim. Since 2021, the company is a subsidiary of Renesas Electronics.

== History ==
Dialog Semiconductor was created in May 1985 as IMP (UK) Limited, the European subsidiary of U.S.-based International Microelectric Products, Inc. In late 1989, Daimler-Benz (now Daimler AG) acquired IMP (UK) and folded the business into subsidiary Temic Telefunken Microelectric GmbH. In March 1998, Apax Partners, Adtran, and Ericsson provided funding for the subsidiary (then named Dialogue Semiconductors) to separate from Daimler and form an independent company.

Dialog began trading as a public company on the Frankfurt Stock Exchange on 18 September 1999.

In 2005, Jalal Bagherli was appointed as Dialog's CEO. He had previously been CEO of Alphamosaic, a video processing chip specialist acquired by Broadcom in 2004.

Since 2007, Dialog Semiconductor has been a supplier of power management integrated circuits (PMICs) for the Apple iPhone, iPad, and Watch. Apple comprised 74% of Dialog's sales in 2016.

=== Acquisitions ===
Dialog system-on-chip

Dialog has made numerous acquisitions including:

- 2011 - VoIP and wireless chipmaker SiTel Semiconductor for $86.5 million.
- 2013 - Dialog acquired iWatt Inc, which had filed for an IPO the prior year, for roughly $345 million, paying $310 million in cash and pledging an additional $35 million in contingent considerations.
- 2015 - Dialog made a $4.6 billion offer for Atmel. This acquisition was cancelled in January 2016 when Atmel instead agreed to be purchased by Microchip for $3.56 billion in cash and stock. To break the agreement, Atmel paid Dialog a termination fee of $137.3 million.
- 2017 - Silego Technology, a maker of configurable mixed-signal integrated circuits (CMICs), for $306 million, of which $276 would be paid in cash, with an additional contingent consideration of up to $30.4 million. The deal added consumer electronics companies like Fitbit, Garmin, and GoPro to Dialog's roster of customers.
- 2018 - Apple announced its intent to purchase part of Dialog's business in a $300 million cash deal. Included in the deal was the transfer of 300 Dialog employees to Apple, which represented roughly 16% of Dialog's workforce. Apple also committed another $300 million to purchase Dialog products. In April 2019, Dialog and Apple completed the workforce and intellectual property transfer aspects of the deal.
- 2019 - Dialog agreed to buy Silicon Motion's FCI mobile communications product line for $45 million. The deal expanded Dialog's range of low-power connected devices by adding FCI's battery-operated Wi-Fi Internet of Things controllers to its existing line of Bluetooth products. The acquisition also added roughly 100 engineers, based in South Korea, to Dialog's workforce.
- 2019 - Dialog agreed to buy Germany’s Creative Chips as part of its push into low-energy connectivity used for devices in the internet of things (IoT). Dialog paid $80 million for the acquisition, with an additional consideration of $23 million based on revenues targets for the next two years.
- 2020 - Dialog bought US-based Adesto Technologies, a provider of application-specific semiconductors and embedded systems for the Industrial IoT, for $500 million.
- 2021 - In February 2021, Renesas announced that it has agreed to buy Dialog Semiconductor for $5.9 billion.

At that point, Jalal Bagherli held more than 500,000 Dialog shares.

== Products ==
Dialog sold a range of products, such as PMICs targeted at the automotives and wearable industry, as well as smartphones, with a majority of the revenue in 2018 coming from PMIC sales to Apple. Dialog also offered Zero Voltage Switching Power Converter Chips and developed DC-DC converter with TDK. IO-Links like the CCE4503, primarily meant for use in IoT-Devices, were also offered alongside LED-Driver, USB power delivery controller as well as Audio CODECs. In 2020 Dialog licensed its CBRAM to GlobalFoundries.
