= RS Group plc =

British-based distributor of industrial and electronics products

- Company type: Public
- Traded as: LSE: RS1; FTSE 250 component
- Founded: 1937; 89 years ago
- Headquarters: London, England, UK
- Key people: Baroness Rona Fairhead (chairperson); Simon Pryce (CEO)
- Revenue: ▼£2,881.1 million (2026)
- Operating income: ▲£238.6 million (2026)
- Net income: ▲£161.9 million (2026)
- Website: www.rsgroup.com

RS Group plc (formerly Electrocomponents plc) is a distributor of industrial and electrical products based in London, England. It is listed on the London Stock Exchange and is a constituent of the FTSE 250 Index.

== History ==
1980 catalogue (universal) vs 2010 ed. (Australia)

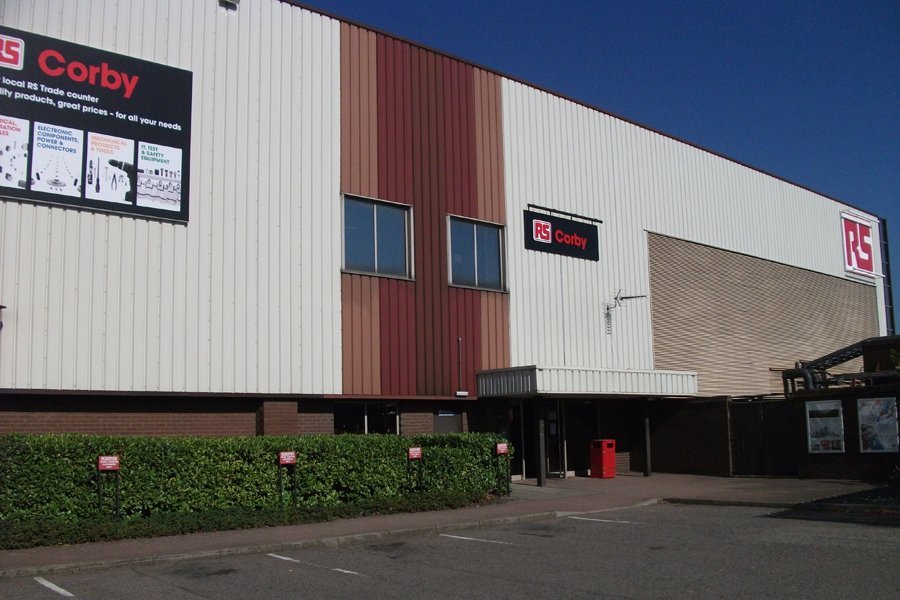
Trade counter in Corby

The company was founded by J. H. Waring and P. M. Sebestyen as Radiospares in a lock-up garage at Lanark Villas in Maida Vale in London in 1937. It supplied radio repair shops with spare parts – replacement electronic components and mechanical components for radio receivers and transmitters.

When television sets became popular, the company added television parts to their product list. As the company expanded it moved to Birchington Road in Kilburn. By the end of the Second World War, the company had evolved into a large national distribution company. In 1954, the founders of Radiospares expanded the company's focus from shops and home users to the industrial sector and began selling electronic components to manufacturers.

The company was first listed on the London Stock Exchange as Electrocomponents in 1967. It also operated from Fitzroy House in Epworth Street in Islington during the 1970s.

A feature of the company's operations was its free illustrated catalogue, with every item being given an eight-digit part number. At first, a separate price list was published annually for each country serviced, mail orders were despatched on day of ordering, and cost of postage was borne by the company. Data sheets on individual components were available, free of charge, on request.

It opened a distribution centre at Corby in Northamptonshire in 1984, introduced a CD-ROM catalogue and opened a distribution centre in Nuneaton in Warwickshire in 1995, launched its own E-commerce web site in 1998 and acquired Allied Electronics, a US-based distributor, in 1999.

In 2010, its two main operating companies, RS Components and Allied Electronics, launched free-to-use PCB layout software, DesignSpark PCB. Then in 2012, RS Components and Allied Electronics became two of the main manufacturers and distributors for the Raspberry Pi. It acquired a UK-based provider of outsourcing services, IESA, in May 2018.

In March 2022, Electrocomponents plc announced that it would change its name to RS Group plc in early May 2022. Allied Electronics was brought under RS brand as RS Americas, Inc. in 2023.

== Operations ==
RS Group plc is an omni-channel provider of products and services for designers, builders and maintainers of industrial equipment and operations, serving over 1 million customers in more than 80 countries. The company distributes over 600,000 products, including electronic components, electrical, automation and control, and test and measurement equipment, and engineering tools and consumables, sourced from 2,500 suppliers. The company trades under the brands:

- RS - operations across the world
- RS Americas (formerly Allied Electronics) - operations in North America
- OKdo - Global tech company focused on SBC and IoT, serving hobbyists, entrepreneurs, industrial designers and resellers

== Awards ==
- 2017 - Electrocomponents won Turnaround of the Year Award at the PLC Awards 2016
- 2014 - Electrocomponents was named UKTI Digital Business of the Year at the 2014 National Business Awards
- 2012 - Electrocomponents was presented the Queen's Award for Enterprise for continuous achievement in international trade
