= Micro-Cap =

Analog and digital circuit simulator

- Original authors: Andy Thompson, Tim O'Brien, Bill Steele
- Developer: Spectrum Software
- Release: September 1982; 44 years ago
- Final release: 12.2.0.5 / June 17, 2021; 5 years ago
- Operating system: Windows 2K, XP, Vista, 7, 8, 8.1, 10
- Platform: IA-32, x86-64
- Size: 58 MB
- Available in: English
- Type: Electronic design automation
- License: Freeware
- Website: Website archive

Micro-Cap is a SPICE compatible analog/digital circuit simulator with an integrated schematic editor that provides an interactive sketch and simulate environment for electronics engineers. It was developed by Spectrum Software, and was only available with a paid commercial license. In July 2019, Spectrum Software closed down and Micro-Cap was released as freeware. Software updates and technical support are no longer available. In early 2023, their website went offline, though it was previously backed up at archive.org.

== Version history ==
The name Micro-Cap was derived from the term Microcomputer Circuit Analysis Program. The forerunners to the Micro-Cap simulator were the Logic Designer and Simulator. Released in June 1980, this product was the first integrated circuit editor and logic simulation system available for personal computers. Its primary goal was to provide a “circuit creation and simulation” environment for digital simulation.

In August 1981, the analog equivalent of the first program, Circuit Designer and Simulator, was released. Its integrated text editor created circuit descriptions for a simple, linear, analog simulator. September 1982 saw the release of the first Micro-Cap package as a successor to the Circuit Designer and Simulator.

- 1982 Micro-Cap
- 1984 Micro-Cap 2
- 1988 Micro-Cap 3
- 1992 Micro-Cap 4
- 1995 Micro-Cap 5
- 1997 Micro-Cap 5 2.0
- 1999 Micro-Cap 6
- 2001 Micro-Cap 7
- 2004 Micro-Cap 8
- 2007 Micro-Cap 9
- 2010 Micro-Cap 10
- 2013 Micro-Cap 11
- 2018 Micro-Cap 12 - the final major version

== See also ==
- Comparison of EDA software
- List of free electronics circuit simulators
