= Silvaco =

American software company

Silvaco Group, Inc.
- Type: Public
- Traded as: Nasdaq: SVCO
- Industry: Software
- Founded: 1984; 42 years ago
- Founder: Ivan Pesic
- Headquarters: Santa Clara, California, U.S.
- Key people: Kathy Pesic (Chair); Wally Rhines (CEO); Iliya Pesic (former Chair)
- Website: silvaco.com

Silvaco Group, Inc. is an American company that develops and markets electronic design automation (EDA) and technology CAD (TCAD) software and semiconductor design IP (SIP). The company is headquartered in Santa Clara, California, and has offices in North America, Europe, and throughout Asia. Founded in 1984, Silvaco is a publicly traded EDA company. The company has been known by at least two other names: Silvaco International and Silvaco Data Systems.

== History ==
Founded by Dr. Ivan Pesic (13 September 1951, Resnik, Montenegro — 20 October 2012, Japan) in 1984, the company was privately held and internally funded until its May 2024 initial public offering. It is headquartered in Santa Clara, California, with fourteen offices worldwide.

In 2003 Silvaco acquired Simucad Inc., a privately held company founded in 1981 that provided logic simulation EDA software. Silvaco re-launched the brand by spinning out its EDA product line in 2006 under the Simucad name. As of 17 February 2010, Simucad Design Automation and Silvaco Data Systems were merged back together forming Silvaco, Inc.

In 2012, David Halliday was appointed CEO after the death of the company founder Ivan Pesic.

In 2015, Silvaco appointed a new CEO, David Dutton. The company also acquired Invarian, Inc., a privately held company providing power integrity analysis software, and acquired Infiniscale SA, a privately held company in France providing variability analysis software.

In 2016, Silvaco added semiconductor design IP (SIP) to its portfolio with the acquisition of the privately held company IPextreme, Inc. Silvaco also entered into another new market segment with the acquisition of the privately held company edXact in France. The tools from edXact are used for analysis, reduction, and comparison of extracted parasitic netlists.

In 2017, Silvaco acquired SoC Solutions, a privately held company providing semiconductor IP.

In 2018, Silvaco acquired NanGate, a privately held company providing tools and services for creation, optimization, characterization, and validation of physical library IP. The company also announced a partnership with Purdue University and the Purdue Research Foundation for the commercialization of the NEMO tool suite, which is used for nanoelectronics modeling and atomistic simulation.

in 2018, Silvaco appointed Dr. Babak Taheri as Chief Technology Officer and Executive Vice President of Products.

In 2019, Silvaco appointed Dr. Babak Taheri as its new Chief Executive Officer. Prior to his appointment, he was Silvaco's Chief Technical Officer.

In 2020, Silvaco acquired the assets of Coupling Wave Solutions S.A., a privately held company providing silicon substrate noise analysis software.

In 2020, Silvaco acquired memory compiler technology of Dolphin Design SAS. The acquisition expanded company’s design IP portfolio to provide embedded memories for SoC applications.

In 2021, Silvaco acquired Physical Verification Solution Provider POLYTEDA CLOUD LLC. The acquisition expanded company’s capabilities for rapid physical verification of IC designs prior to mask creation and manufacturing and for cloud enablement of EDA tools.

In April 2024, Silvaco announced the launch of its initial public offering with a listing on the Nasdaq. On May 8, the IPO pricing was announced at $19 per share to raise a total of $114M.

In August 2025, EDA visionary Wally Rhines became the CEO of Silvaco, where he continues to steer the growth and strategy of the organization.

== Products ==
Silvaco delivers EDA and semiconductor TCAD software products and semiconductor design IP with support and engineering services. Worldwide customers include foundries, fabless semiconductor companies, OEMs, integrated semiconductor manufacturers, and universities.

=== TCAD ===
Process Simulation

- Victory Process – 2D/3D process simulator

Device Simulation

- Victory Device 2D/3D device simulator

Other tools

- Virtual Wafer Fab (VWF) – Emulation of wafer manufacturing to perform design-of-experiments and optimization.

=== EDA ===
The company supplies integrated EDA software in the areas of analog/mixed-signal/RF circuit simulation, custom IC CAD, interconnect modeling, and standard cell library development and characterization.

SPICE modeling and analog & mixed-signal simulation

- Utmost IV – Device characterization and SPICE modeling
- SmartSpice – Analog circuit simulator
- SmartSpice RF – Frequency and time domain RF circuit simulator
- SmartView – Simulation waveform viewer

Custom IC CAD

- Gateway – Schematic editor
- Expert – Layout editor
- Guardian – DRC/LVS/Net physical verification
- Hipex – Full-chip parasitic extraction
- Jivaro – Parasitic reduction and analysis
- VarMan – High-sigma variability analysis

Interconnect Modeling

- Clever – Parasitic extractor for realistic 3D structures

Library Platform

- Cello – Standard cell library creation, migration and optimization
- Viola – Standard cell library and I/O cell characterization
- Liberty Analyzer – Analysis and validation of timing, power, noise, and area data from characterization

=== SIP ===
The company markets a variety of semiconductor design IP (SIP). In May 2019, the company announced that the semiconductor design IP of Samsung Foundry (SF) is now marketed, licensed, and supported through Silvaco. SIP categories include:

- Interface PHYs
- Interface controllers
- Automotive controllers
- AMBA IP cores and subsystems
- Security cores
- Analog cores
- Embedded processors
- Analog front-ends and codecs
- Foundation IP
  - Standard cell libraries
  - Embedded memories
  - I/Os
