= HILO HDL =

Electronics design language and simulator

HILO HDL (or "HILO") was an early hardware description language (HDL) and logic simulation framework developed in the late 1970s and early 1980s. HILO influenced subsequent simulation tools and the evolution of standardized HDLs like VHDL and Verilog.

== History ==
The development of HILO can be traced to efforts by researchers and engineers seeking a more efficient approach to simulate increasingly complex large-scale integrated (LSI) circuits. Early work on HILO appears in the late 1970s under the auspices of several contributors, notably Peter Flake, Phil Moorby, and Simon Davidmann. They introduced HILO as a "high-level interactive logic simulator," capable of modeling circuits at both the gate level and a more abstract behavioral level.

By 1979–1980, the team released an enhanced version called “HILO-2", which expanded the language’s hierarchical modeling features and improved simulation efficiency. Demonstrations at industry events such as the Design Automation Conference (DAC) generated interest among early adopters in academic and industrial R&D labs. However, the lack of formal standardization and the eventual rise of VHDL (sponsored by the U.S. Department of Defense) and the evolution into Verilog (popularized by Gateway Design Automation) overshadowed HILO’s broader adoption in commercial EDA tool flows.

The HILO project started in the UK in early 1970s (HILO-1) and was commercialized at Brunel University in the 1980s (HILO-2) and later by Cirrus Computers and finally by GenRad (HILO-3). HILO-1 only had language constructs for modeling circuit's logical structure and was written in assembler. HILO-2 extended the structural modeling and added the first Register Transfer Language (RTL) with timing and was written in the BCPL language.

The HILO-2 project at Brunel had Peter Flake as the Technical Authority and Phil Moorby, Simon Davidmann, and others, working on the language and simulators.

== Features ==
HILO was one of the first commercial Hardware Description Languages used to describe and simulate electronics circuits and it was the basis for what became Verilog which has now evolved into SystemVerilog.

HILO-2 had one language for electronic hardware description, and a different language for stimulus and simulator control.

HILO-2 combined an interactive logic simulator with a hardware description language. The HDL was completely declarative, consisting of a hierarchical netlist of multiple-levels of abstraction, primitive gates, and flip-flops, as well as configurable functions. The simulator had an event driven kernel which was more efficient than the cycle-based approaches of that era and had a command line interface to interactively inspect, trace, and force signals to values and thereby making debugging efficient. The HDL and simulator also had abstract higher level behavioral constructs on top of the standard gate-level constructs cutting time to model circuits.

These capabilities differentiated HILO-2 from simpler netlist-driven simulators of the 1970s. They offered early access to initial features of more advanced HDL paradigms that soon became industry standards.

HILO-2 had two simulators: a fault-free logic simulator for exploring a design's behavior, and a fault simulator for simulating a design with faults injected to grade tests for functional board testing.

== Adoption and usage ==
During the early 1980s, HILO-2 was used in some UK universities for research, teaching and coursework such as Brunel University of London and by early LSI design teams citing faster execution compared to older simulators such as Wang Laboratories.

HILO-2 and HILO-3 never achieved the same level of industrial standardization as VHDL or Verilog. Nevertheless, its concepts helped shape the conversation around higher-level hardware modeling in the 1980s.

In 1981 Prabhu Goel of Wang Laboratories in Massachusetts, United States, became the first U.S. customer of HILO-2 to be used in the design and verification of a 10,000 gate ASIC.

In 1982 Prabhu left Wang and set up what became Gateway and subsequently hired Phil Moorby who evolved the HILO-2 structural description syntax and keywords into Verilog with minor changes.

== Reception ==
Reviews of HILO were mixed. HILO was noted for its hierarchical approach, interactive debugging, and fast verification cycles for complex digital systems. However, reviewers pointed out that the language lacked being an official open standard or broad EDA vendor support, limiting long-term adoption and viability.

By the mid-to-late 1980s, industry momentum had shifted significantly toward VHDL (standardized under IEEE 1076 in 1987) and Verilog (eventually IEEE 1364), leaving HILO primarily in niche use or academic reference.

In 1984, HILO-2 was acquired by GenRad (General Radio) and the HDL was renamed GHDL (GenRad HDL) with the simulator being called HILO-3 and being re-written in C and ported to Unix.

Ultimately, Verilog became the HDL and simulator of choice in the industry and interest in HILO reduced.

== Influence ==
Despite its declining user base, HILO has been cited in historical analyses of HDL development and EDA tools. Some of its concepts—particularly hierarchical modeling and event-driven simulation—resurfaced in the mainstream adoption of high-level HDLs and advanced verification methodologies in the 1990s.

Modern references to HILO typically appear in retrospectives or textbook discussions of HDL evolution. It has been listed it as one of the early pioneers in the development of hardware design languages.

== See also ==
- Superlog HDL
- SystemVerilog
- Verilog
- VHDL
