= Specman =

Specman is an EDA tool that provides advanced automated functional verification of hardware designs. It provides an environment for working with, compiling, and debugging testbench environments written in the e Hardware Verification Language. Specman also offers automated testbench generation to boost productivity in the context of block, chip, and system verification.

The Specman tool itself does not include an HDL simulator (for design languages such as VHDL or Verilog.) To simulate an e-testbench with a design written in VHDL/Verilog, Specman must be run in conjunction with a separate HDL simulation tool. Specman is a feature of Cadence's new Xcelium simulator, where tighter product integration offers both faster runtime performance and debugs capabilities not available with other HDL simulators. In principle, Specman can co-simulate with any HDL simulator supporting standard PLI or VHPI interface, such as Synopsys's VCS, or Mentor's Questa.

== History ==
Specman was originally developed at Verisity, an Israel-based company, which was acquired by Cadence on April 7, 2005.

It is now part of Cadence's functional verification suite.
