= ADMS =

Automatic Device Model Synthesizer (ADMS) is public domain software used in the semiconductor industry to translate Verilog-A models into C-models which can be directly read by a number of SPICE simulators, including Spectre Circuit Simulator, Ngspice, and HSpice.

== Overview ==
ADMS stands for Automatic Device Model Synthesizer. ADMS can be used to turn Verilog-A compact models into C code. ADMS interpreter parses a Verilog-AMS file to build a data tree. XML filters are applied on the tree to generate the output files.

ADMS aims to reduce the effort of circuit simulator developers to integrate device models - at the same time, it provides the option to compact model developers to use the vendor-neutral language Verilog-A for model definition, improving robustness and maintainability.

ADMS is used by the open source SPICE simulator NGSPICE to support a number of compact models. Following models are supported by NGSPICE using ADMS:

- MOS EKV (LEVEL=44)
- MOS PSP102 (LEVEL=45)
- BJT Mextram 504 (LEVEL=6)
- BJT Hicum0 (LEVEL=7)
- BJT Hicum2 (LEVEL=8)

The upstream version of the original ADMS project hasn't been updated since version 2.3.0. The Qucs project has created a fork of ADMS that is still being used as code generator to generate models of compact devices written in Verilog-AMS into source code for the SPICE simulator. The maintained fork only supports a subset of Verilog-AMS language.

ADMS is still part of electronic-circuit simulation software. According to the documents of the ngspice project, ADMS is used to convert Verilog-AMS compact models to C for integration with ngspice.

== Limitations ==
ADMS only parses a subset of Verilog-A, and not all statements are supported by all XML filters. Specifically, current controlled voltage sources are not supported in most filters targeting SPICE simulators:

- V(..) <+ I(..) // doesn't work with NGSPICE

Instead, this needs to be represented as a conductance expression (and not impedance).
i.e. I(..) <+ V(..)

- I (..) probes don't work with NGSPICE

Some other language constructions need to be supported in the filter as well

- for loop,
- case statement.

Many language features are hard to support with ADMS filters

- laplace_transform,
- idt,
- switching branches.

Important aspects of code generation are close to impossible with ADMS

- dataflow analysis
- code optimisation,

and

- ADMS is extremely slow (which can be seen on slightly larger models).

== See also ==
- Verilog-A
- SPICE
- GNU Circuit Analysis Package
- List of public domain software
