= Ken Kundert =

Creator of Spectre, SpectreRF, and Verilog-A; pioneer of analog verification

Kenneth S. Kundert

Kenneth S. Kundert is an engineer who has done work in the area of electronic design automation (EDA). He studied electrical engineering at the University of California, Berkeley under professors Alberto Sangiovanni-Vincentelli and Robert G. Meyer and received his doctorate in 1989. During this time, he created the circuit simulator that eventually became the Advanced Design System from what is now PathWave Design and the Spectre circuit simulator from Cadence Design Systems.

Kundert co-founded Designer's Guide Consulting and created the Designer's Guide Community. From 1989 to 2005 he was a Fellow at Cadence Design Systems during which time he was the principal architect of the Spectre circuit simulation family. As such, he has led the development of Spectre, SpectreHDL, and SpectreRF. He was also the primary developer of Verilog-A and made substantial contributions to both the Verilog-AMS and VHDL-AMS languages. He has written three books on circuit simulation: The Designer's Guide to Verilog-AMS, The Designer's Guide to SPICE and Spectre, and Steady-State Methods for Simulating Analog and Microwave Circuits.

Since 2005, Kundert, along with Henry Chang, has worked to develop the field of analog verification.

More recently Kundert has developed a number of notable open source software packages, including NestedText.

Kundert was elevated to the status of IEEE Fellow in 2007 for contributions to the simulation and modeling of analog, RF, and mixed-signal circuits. In 2022 he, along with Ricardo Telichevesky and Jacob K. White, was awarded the ACM/IEEE A. Richard Newton Technical Impact Award in Electronic Design Automation for their paper Efficient steady-state analysis based on matrix-free Krylov-subspace methods.
