= Jacob White =

Jacob White may refer to:

- Jacob White (cricketer) (1764–1831), English cricketer
- Jacob C. White Jr. (1837–1902), American educator, intellectual, and civil rights activist
- Jacob K. White, American computer scientist
