= Metheus =

Defunct American graphics hardware company

Metheus Corporation
- Company type: Private
- Founded: July 1981; 44 years ago
- Founders: Gene Chao; Robert Bruce; C. Hock Leow
- Defunct: February 1999; 26 years ago
- Fate: Acquired by Barco Display Systems
- Products: Video display controllers; Workstations
- Number of employees: Over 100 (1985, peak)
- Website: metheus.com at the Wayback Machine (archived 1998-01-10)

Metheus Corporation was an American computer graphics company active from 1981 to 1999 and based in Washington County, Oregon. It produced high-performance video display controllers and graphics cards for the CAD/CAM market under the Omega brand, designing such cards for both mainframe and minicomputer systems as well as microcomputer-based workstations. It also produced a line of dedicated Unix workstations under the Lambda brand in the 1980s. Its Omega 3000 line of workstation graphics cards were the first on the market capable of a resolution exceeding 2000 by 2000 pixels in 1986. In 1999, it was acquired by Barco Display Systems of Belgium.

== History ==
=== Foundation (1981–1984) ===
Metheus Corporation was founded in July 1981 in Hillsboro, Oregon, by six former employees of Tektronix, a nearby manufacturer of electronic test equipment headquartered in Beaverton, Oregon. Its principal founder was Gene Chao, a 20-year veteran of the electronics industry, with stints in both large corporations such as Tektronix as well as government organizations such as NASA, where he designed microwave transmission equipment for the Apollo CSM and Lunar Module communications systems. Chao was Tektronix's head of applied research before he left to start Metheus. Other Metheus co-founders from Tektronix included Robert Bruce and C. Hock Leow. Despite the company being the progeny of Tektronix, Metheus made it a point not to poach anyone who worked at Tektronix unless they initiated the job inquiry. According to Inc., this was part of a gentleman's agreement between the two companies that also served to reduce the risk of lawsuits regarding breaches of trade secrets. The company was raised using the co-founders pool of money before they received their first round of venture capital funding in 1984 with US$11.5 million.

In 1982, Metheus began production of their first and flagship family of video display controllers, which Metheus named the Omega line. The first entry in the series, the Omega 500, was released in the summer of 1983; it was capable of displaying graphics at a maximum resolution of 1280 by 1024 pixels in 256 colors (from a palette of 16.7 million colors) with a 60-MHz refresh rate. Metheus offered it both as a standalone device in its own case, akin to a graphics terminal, as well as the bare boards for connecting to a mainframe or mini. It was designed around three 6-MHz Am2901 bit-slice microprocessors. The Omega 500 also provided a video mode with a resolution of 640 by 512 pixels with a greater color depth.

Metheus eventually expanded the Omega family to include expansion cards for the IBM PC and compatibles as well as VMEbus-based computer systems in the mid-1980s, starting with the Omega PC expansion card for the IBM PC AT in August 1985. In October 1987, the company introduced the Ultra Graphics Accelerator (UGA) board. A competitor to IBM's own VGA, it supported the IBM PC XT and could display color graphics up to 1024 by 768 pixels. It also supported emulated CGA and EGA graphics. Software that supported UGA included, among others, Aldus PageMaker, Harvard Graphics, Ventura Publisher, AutoCAD, CADKEY, P-CAD, and VersaCAD; desktop environments that supported UGA included GEM and both Windows 1.0 and Windows/286.

The Omega family was preceded in release by the Lambda 750 in February 1983. The Lambda 750 was a dedicated graphical Unix workstation that made use of the company's proprietary Omega VDC. The Lambda ran 4.1 BSD Unix between Motorola 68000 processors, one of which acted as the primary CPU and the other as an interface controller for memory and peripherals. As well as an interface controller, the second 68000 was also in charge of handling the graphical shell for the Unix installation. The Lambda 750 was aimed at system integrators, who resold it as turnkey workstations for buyers from specific fields—not only CAD/CAM but also other scientific and industrial applications, including cartography, graphic design, imaging, and simulation. In late 1983, Metheus signed an agreement with GenRad to resell the latter company's HILO 2 logic simulation software. The Lambda proved fairly popular; in 1983, Metheus achieved sales of $6 million. In 1984, the company reached $14 million in sales across their entire product line and established their first international offices in England. By August 1985, they had over 100 employees from their 75,000-square-foot offices in Hillsboro.

=== Growth and expansion (1984–1987) ===
In July 1984, Metheus spun off a portion of its workstation-manufacturing division to form a joint venture with Computervision, then the market leader in turnkey CAD/CAM systems. This joint venture, known as Metheus-CV, Inc., allowed Computervision to compete in the low-end CAD/CAM and CAE markets, where Computervision lost ground to companies such as Mentor Graphics (Metheus' chief rival also co-founded by ex-Tektronix employees), Daisy Systems, and Valid Logic. Metheus received $10 million in cash in exchange for Computervision receiving a 20-percent stake in Metheus-CV.

In August 1986, Metheus released the first commercially available VDC capable of displaying graphics at a square 2K resolution with the Omega 3000. Its resolution maxed out at 2048 by 2048 pixels—exactly double that than the square 1K-resolution VDCs used throughout the graphical workstation industry—while its color depth maxed out at 6 bits (64 colors). Metheus aimed the Omega 3000 at the electronic publishing and weather radar fields. The Omega 3000 made use of custom GaAs ICs to handle the bandwidth of the maximum resolution as well as off-the-shelf parts from Motorola and AMD, including the 68020, the 68881, and the Am29325. Metheus collaborated with Sony to develop the Sony DDM-2801, a bespoke Trinitron-based display that could handle this resolution. Metheus stood alone in the industry in offering a VDC capable of displaying such a high resolution until mid-1988, when competitors such as CalComp and Raytheon announced plans to develop similar VDCs.

=== Chapter 11 bankruptcy, pivot, and acquisition (1987–1999) ===
Metheus's planned initial public offering was derailed by the Black Monday of October 1987, and in April 1988 they filed for Chapter 11 bankruptcy, having fallen $10.6 million into debt owed to several hundreds of creditors. While sales in Metheus were strong, the company had never reported a profit in any quarter. The company attempted to reorganize before filing for Chapter 11 by shedding its loss-making Metheus-CV division, but by April the board of directors could not commit to a singular vision for Metheus's future. In October 1988, the company exited bankruptcy after finding a buyer in Singapore Technology Corporation, a holding company based in Singapore who paid off $2.52 million of the Metheus's debts in exchange for full ownership of the company. Following the acquisition, the company reported their first quarterly profit.

By the end of the 1990s, Metheus had pivoted to specialized high-performance graphics cards aimed at medical imaging needs, while also serving buyers in air traffic control and military surveillance. In January 1999, Barco Display Systems announced their acquisition of Metheus for an undisclosed amount. Barco's acquisition was largely fueled on the strength of Metheus's market share in medical imaging. The acquisition was finalized in late February 1999.
