= E Reuse Methodology =

The e Reuse Methodology (eRM) was the first reuse methodology to emerge in the Hardware Verification Language space and was used in conjunction with the e Hardware Verification Language. It was invented in 2001 by Verisity Design and released in 2002. The methodology was composed of guidelines for topics such as:

- File naming conventions
- Functional partitioning of the testbench
- Code packaging Guidelines
- Sequence and message class libraries

The e Reuse Methodology was widely accepted by verification engineers and is the most widely used and successful reuse methodology with thousands of successful projects.

eRM formed the basis of the URM (Universal Reuse Methodology) developed by Cadence Design Systems for the SystemVerilog verification language. URM, together with contribution from Mentor Graphics' AVM, later became the OVM (Open Verification Methodology), and eventually becoming the UVM (Universal Verification Methodology).
