= Section header =

Section header may refer to:

- Section (typography), the beginning of a new section in a document
- Radical (Chinese characters)
- Executable and Linkable Format § Section Header

== See also ==
- ISO 10303-21 § HEADER section
- Value change dump § Header section
- List of HTTP header fields
