= S.Y.H. Su =

S.Y.H. Su was professor of Computer Science known for his contributions in Hardware description languages and hardware testing. After serving at several institutions, he joined Binghamton University in 1978, from where he retired.

== Education ==
Stephen Y.H. Su (formerly known as Yueh-Hsung Su) was born in Fukien, China, on July 6, 1938. He received B.S. in electrical engineering from the National Taiwan University, and the M.S. in electrical engineering in 1963. He received Ph.D. in computer engineering, both from the University of Wisconsin, Madison, in 1967 where he was advised by Professor Donald L. Dietmeyer on the automated synthesis of digital circuits.

== Academic career ==
He served as a faculty member at University of Southern California, Case Western Reserve University, City University of New York, NYU Tandon School of Engineering, and the Utah State University before joining Binghamton University in 1978 as the Chairman of the Department of Computer Science.

== Professional Contributions ==
He served as an Associate Editor of the IEEE Transaction on Computers. He was the Guest Editor for Computer's Special Issue on Hardware Description Language Applications. He served as a chair of the 1975 International Symposium on Computer Hardware Description Languages and Their Applications and the 1976 International Symposium on Multiple-Valued Logic. He was an Advisor for the IEEE Distinguished Visitor Program.

He received the Engineer of the Year Award in 1981.

He and his students published widely on automated design of digital circuits, hardware description language, fault detection, intermittent, delay and transistor-level faults. He supervised several PhD students including Chi-Lai Huang who had worked on a hardware description language LALSD. He later co-invented Verilog hardware description language at Gateway Design Automation. His student Yacoub El-Ziq co-founded a startup XCAT, producing a dedicated hardware system for simulation and test generation in 1985. It was later acquired by Gateway Design Automation.
