= Prototype Verification System =

Proof assistant program

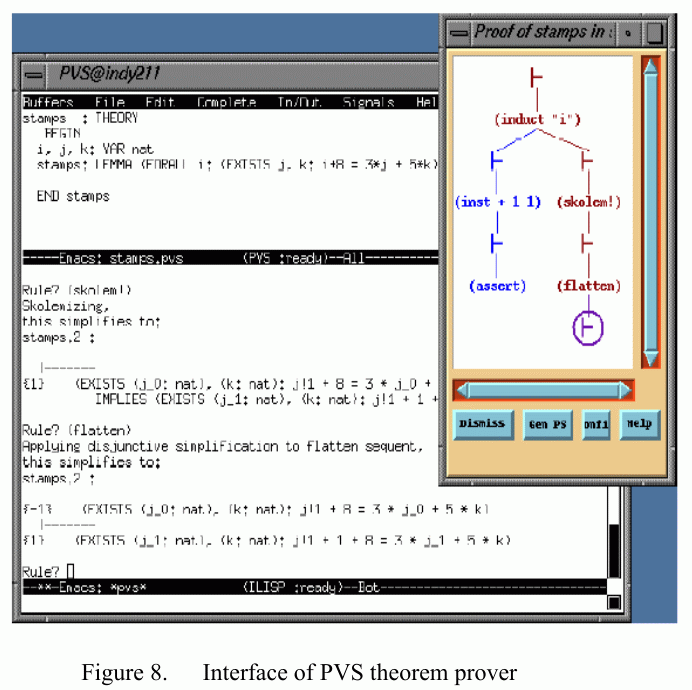
PVS screenshot

The Prototype Verification System (PVS) is a specification language integrated with support tools and an automated theorem prover, developed at the Computer Science Laboratory of SRI International in Menlo Park, California.

PVS is based on a kernel consisting of an extension of Church's theory of types with dependent types, and is fundamentally a classical typed higher-order logic. The base types include uninterpreted types that may be introduced by the user, and built-in types such as the booleans, integers, reals, and the ordinals. Type-constructors include functions, sets, tuples, records, enumerations, and abstract data types. Predicate subtypes and dependent types can be used to introduce constraints; these constrained types may incur proof obligations (called type-correctness conditions or TCCs) during typechecking. PVS specifications are organized into parameterized theories.

The system is implemented in Common Lisp, and is released under the GNU General Public License (GPL).

== See also ==
- Formal methods
- List of proof assistants
- Rosetta-lang
