= NeoAccel =

NeoAccel, Inc.
- Industry: Computer hardware
- Founded: 2004; 22 years ago, in San Jose, California
- Fate: Acquired by VMware
- Headquarters: United States

NeoAccel, Inc. was a multinational company that sells computer network security products direct to the end-user and through OEM relationships. In 2011, NeoAccel was purchased by VMware.

== History ==
NeoAccel was founded in 2004 by former NetScaler (purchased by Citrix) CEO & Founder, Michel Susai. NeoAccel received financial support and venture capital infusions from Hotmail founder Sabeer Bhatia, and inventor Prabhu Goel. In 2006 NeoAccel raised $4,000,000 from Baring Private Equity Partners and NTT Leasing.

The company was headquartered in San Jose, California with a development office in Navi Mumbai, India.

== Products ==
NeoAccel's flagship product was SSL VPN-Plus. NAC-Plus was the company's network access control device released in 2007
