= Foundation For Excellence =

Indian non-profit organization

- Founded: 1994
- Founder: Prabhu Goel; Poonam Goel
- Type: Non-profit
- Purpose: Provide funds for higher education to students in India who are academically gifted and come from very low income families
- Location(s): Sunnyvale, CA, United States & Bangalore, India
- Region served: Education
- Product: Scholarships
- Key people: Prabhu Goel; Poonam Goel; Kanwal Rekhi; Romesh Wadhwani
- Volunteers: 700
- Website: ffe.org

The Foundation for Excellence is a publicly supported non-profit organization in India. The FFE's focus is to provide funds for higher education to students in India who are academically gifted and from low-income families.

Since its inception, the foundation has provided over $11.4 million in over 81,590 scholarships to 28,782 deserving students across 28 states in India.

== Objective ==
The objective driving the programs is "No Scholar Left Behind." FFE believes that these young people will be a significant part of a socially and economically stronger India in the near future.

With the help of donors and volunteers, FFE plans to keep on with its efforts until every deserving student in India gets the education that she or he deserves.

== Mission ==
The mission of Foundation For Excellence (FFE) is to help exceptionally talented but economically underprivileged students in India to pursue their higher education in Engineering, medicine, Pharmacy and Law. FFE awards scholarships to recent high school students who have overcome the adversity of their family's circumstances to be among the top ranked in national/state level common entrance tests, based on their secured admissions to quality engineering and medical colleges. In addition to the financial help FFE provides employability skills and mentoring for the complete development of Scholarship awardees.

== History ==
- Dr. Prabhu and Mrs. Poonam Goel establish FFE as a project of Indians of Collective Action, a non-profit organization based in Santa Clara, California - 1994
- Venktesh Shukla becomes 1st President and co-founder of FFE - (1994–2012)
- First scholarship awarded – October 1994
- Foundation for Excellence, Inc. is incorporated within California – December 1997.
- IRS grants tax-exempt, 501 (c) (3) status effective from December 1997 – March 1999
- Mr. Kanwal Rekhi joins FFE as major supporter and trustee – December 1999
- Foundation establishes formal administrative office in Mumbai, India - May 2000
- Dr. Romesh Wadhwani joins FFE as major supporter and trustee – September 2002
- FFE's first chapter is established in New York, NY – November 2002
- FFE promotes and registers Foundation for Excellence India Trust as a public charitable organization in India - July 2003
- FFE India Trust receives recognition as a tax-exempt organization under section 12A of the Indian income tax Act and as an organization eligible for tax deductible contributions under section 80G
- Dr. Sudha Kidao became Managing Trustee - 2011
- Mr. Ram Kolavennu became COO - 2020

Since its inception in 1994 to the end of 2015, the Foundation has provided around 38,168 scholarships to 14,895 students for an amount of US$11.4 million.

The Foundation is exempt from federal income tax under section 501 (a) as an organization described in section 501 (c) (3) of the Internal Revenue Code. The Foundation is also exempt from state franchise or income tax under Section 23710d of the Revenue and Taxation Code of the State of California. The Foundation's employment identification number is 77–0474749.

FFE's principal office is located in Sunnyvale, California, while another office is located in Bangalore City in India.

== The Scholarship Program ==
The Foundation offers scholarships to students who have a proven financial need to enable them to pursue their studies at the high school or graduate level for studies in India. The scholarships are awarded on an annual basis with renewal dependent on continued academic excellence and financial need.

Scholars are selected based on a set of eligibility requirements. The requirements are based on approved courses of study, eligible institutions, academic standards and financial need.

The applicants are qualified by volunteers called "Facilitators" who perform background verification on students. More than 500 volunteer Facilitators are part of the program's network spread across the country in 25 states. The entire process, from application to decision making typically takes 2–4 months. No discrimination is made on the basis of caste, religion, region and gender during the process of awarding the scholarships.

Scholarships are awarded on an annual basis. Renewal of a scholarship is dependent on continued academic excellence and financial need.

The program so far has awarded more than 38,168 scholarships. Students who have graduated with these scholarships have had a positive effect on their careers and personal lives.

== The India Trust ==
FFE has established an organization in India called the Foundation For Excellence India Trust (FFEIT). The organization is recognized as a charitable trust under Section 12A(a) of the Indian Income-Tax Act of 1961. Donations to the Trust are eligible for tax deduction under Section 80G of the Indian Income Tax Act of 1961.

FFEIT has the same mission as that of the Foundation For Excellence (FFE), that is, to bring about a transformation in the lives of economically underprivileged and academically brilliant students in India. This mission is accomplished providing scholarships and other forms of assistance to students pursuing higher education at the higher secondary school, college degree and professional course levels in India. The Trust's program is open to any student in India and there is no discrimination on the basis of caste, community, gender, religion, region or state.

FFEIT is a member of Credibility Alliance, Mumbai. Credibility Alliance is an initiative of voluntary organizations in India that seeks to enhance accountability, transparency, and good governance within the voluntary sector.

A Board of Trustees under the overall guidance of the FFE India Advisory Board manages the Trust.

The Trust's registered and administrative office is located in Bangalore, Karnataka.

== Adopt a Scholar Program (ASP) ==
Various fund-raising programs and activities are under development to meet the growing needs of the Scholarship Program. One of these is Sponsor A Student/Adopt a Student Program (ASP).

The Sponsor/Adopt a Student Program provides an opportunity to donors to make contributions directed towards students with characteristics meeting the donor's preference. For example, the donor could indicate that the student to be sponsored be studying at a specified educational level, or be of a particular gender, or be studying for a particular course of study, or hail from a particular state/district/town in India. The Foundation will periodically provide donors with information on the students funded from out of the donor's contributions. The program:

- Enables individuals, corporate and institutional donors to earmark their donations for scholarships to specific applicants
- Donor's preferences of adopting student(s) from a specific state, course of study, gender, educational institution or other preferences can be instituted.
- 100% of the donor contribution is used for scholarship for the sponsored students.
- Donors are provided an opportunity to maintain contacts with their adopted students and meet them and their parents at their home or other convenient locations.
- Donors are also kept informed on the progress of the students whose education they are sponsoring under the Program. More than 350 donors participate in the program.

== FFE In The News ==
- Helping Talented Students: FFE featured on CNBC-TV18
- The FFE Mentor-Mentee Connect Program was featured in Times of India-Bangalore, 1 Jun 2015
- Better India: Now Financially Disadvantaged Children Don't Have To Stop Dreaming Of Becoming Doctors & Engineers!
- Building Students' Lives Through Trust
- An Ecosystem of Excellence - India Currents, December, 2004
- "FFE Giving the Gift of Education". The Hindu. October 31, 2003.
- Silicon Valley foundation gives scholarships to impoverished students in India
- An Excellent Foundation
- FFE Founder, Dr. Prabhu Goel speaks on Chai with Manjula
