= Spectre RF Option =

Spectre RF technology, an option to the Spectre Circuit Simulation Platform from Cadence, provides RF analyses for the design and verification of RFIC and MMIC designs such as mixers, transceivers, power amplifiers, and high-speed analog designs, including dividers, switched capacitors, filters, and phased-lock loops (PLLs).

Spectre RF Option was first released in 1996 and was notable for three reasons: It was arguably the first RF simulator as it was the first to be designed for large bipolar and CMOS RF circuits; it used shooting methods as its base algorithm; and it pioneered the use of Krylov subspace methods. The use of shooting methods gave Spectre RF Option remarkable robustness, and the Krylov methods gave it a capacity that was roughly 100 times greater than existing simulators at the time. Previously, such simulators were designed to simulate very small GaAs integrated circuits and hybrids. These simulators were based on harmonic balance and could reliably simulate circuits with 10s of transistors, whereas Spectre RF Option could simulate circuits with 1000s of transistors.

Spectre RF Option added the periodic steady-state (PSS) and periodic small-signal analyses. PSS analysis directly computes the PSS response of a circuit. The periodic small-signal analyses use the PSS solution as a periodically time-varying operating point, linearize the circuit about that operating point, and then compute the response of the circuit to small perturbation sources. Effectively, they build a periodically time-varying linear model of the circuit. This is significant as periodically time-varying linear models, unlike the time-invariant linear models used by the traditional small-signal analyses (AC and noise), exhibit frequency conversion. Spectre RF Option pioneered a variety of periodic small-signal analyses, including periodic AC (pac), periodic noise (pnoise), periodic transfer function (pxf), periodic S-parameter (psp), and periodic stability (pstb).

After its introduction, Spectre RF Option quickly became the dominant simulator for RF integrated circuits and was instrumental in establishing the Spectre platform as the most popular circuit simulator for integrated circuits. Eventually, the dominance of Spectre RF Option faded as the use of Krylov subspace methods propagated to other simulators, particularly those based on harmonic balance. Spectre RF Option now provides harmonic balance in addition to shooting methods, both of which are accelerated using Krylov subspace methods.

Spectre RF Option was developed by Ken Kundert, Jacob White, and Ricardo Telichevesky.
