= Prabhu Goel =

American businessman (born 1949)

Prabhu Goel (born 1949) is an Indian American researcher, entrepreneur and businessman, known for having developed the PODEM Automatic test pattern generation and Verilog hardware description language.

In 1970 Goel graduated as an electrical engineer from the Indian Institute of Technology Kanpur, India. He was the President's Gold Medalist of his IIT batch and received a Ph.D. in Electrical Engineering from Carnegie Mellon University, in 1974.

In 1973, he joined IBM's EDA organization where he was involved with chip test automation. At IBM he developed the PODEM algorithm.

In 1980 he was the recipient of the IBM Corporate Award of $50,000 for his contributions to the testing of VLSI chips and systems at IBM.

In 1981 to join Wang Labs. In 1982 to start Gateway Design Automation which developed the now IEEE industry standard Verilog. He started Gateway with an equity investment of $500 and used consulting revenue to sustain himself while he developed Gateway's first product called Testscan. Testscan was a chip design tool that automatically generated manufacturing test vectors to help screen out manufacturing defects in the production of VLSI chips and systems. In Dec 1983, he sold two licenses of Testscan to Raytheon and Texas Instruments for a total of $300,000. Those funds enabled Goel to recruit other team members including Phil Moorby and Chi-Lai Huang in 1984. Phil was a simulation expert while Chi-Lai was a synthesis expert. Gateway developed Verilog with a mission to make a Hardware Description Language which lent itself to automatic synthesis. Phil Moorby architected the language and the product with Chi-Lai ensuring the language was capable of being subjected to automatic synthesis. In 1986 Greylock and Fidelity Ventures made an unsolicited venture investment in Gateway. Prabhu chose to accept the investment to expand his network and advisor group. Gateway negotiated a technology agreement with Motorola Corporation in 1987 that allowed Verilog to be enhanced to Motorola requirements and thereby became the golden simulator for Motorola ASIC. Verilog then went on to become the golden simulator for most ASIC foundries across the world. Prabhu was recognized as the New England Entrepreneur of the Year in 1989. He sold his stake at Gateway for about $80 million in 1990. High-Tech Ventures by Gordon Bell & John McNamara pp 289-299

He won the 2003 IEEE Industrial Pioneer Award for his work on design modeling and design verification through Verilog and Verilog-based design. He is now a private venture capitalist.

He has set up "Poonam and Prabhu Goel Chair" at the Department of Computer Science and Engineering at IIT Kanpur in the area of Internet Space, and the "Prabhu Goel Research Centre For Computer & Internet Security". He was a founding member of TiE (The Indus Entrepreneur) the largest organization of entrepreneurs in the world, with chapters in 42 countries.

== See also ==
- Foundation For Excellence
- NeoAccel
