= Verilog Procedural Interface =

Software interface between C and Verilog

The Verilog Procedural Interface (VPI), originally known as PLI 2.0, is an interface primarily intended for the C programming language. It allows behavioral Verilog code to invoke C functions, and C functions to invoke standard Verilog system tasks. The Verilog Procedural Interface is part of the IEEE 1364 Programming Language Interface standard; the most recent edition of the standard is from 2005. VPI is sometimes also referred to as PLI 2, since it replaces the deprecated Program Language Interface (PLI).

While PLI 1 was deprecated in favor of VPI (aka. PLI 2), PLI 1 is still commonly used over VPI due to its much more widely documented tf_put, tf_get function interface that is described in many verilog reference books.

== Use of C++ ==
C++ is integrable with VPI (PLI 2.0) and PLI 1.0, by using the "extern C/C++" keyword built into C++ compilers.

== Example ==
As an example, consider the following Verilog code fragment:

val = 41;
$increment(val);
$display("After $increment, val=%d", val);

Suppose the increment system task increments its first parameter by one. Using C and the VPI mechanism, the increment task can be implemented as follows:

// Implements the increment system task
static PLI_INT32 increment(PLI_BYTE8 *userdata) {
  vpiHandle systfref, args_iter, argh;
  s_vpi_value argval;
  int value;

  // Obtain a handle to the argument list
  systfref = vpi_handle(vpiSysTfCall, NULL);
  args_iter = vpi_iterate(vpiArgument, systfref);

  // Grab the value of the first argument
  argh = vpi_scan(args_iter);
  argval.format = vpiIntVal;
  vpi_get_value(argh, &argval);
  value = argval.value.integer;
  vpi_printf("VPI routine received %d\n", value);

  // Increment the value and put it back as first argument
  argval.value.integer = value + 1;
  vpi_put_value(argh, &argval, NULL, vpiNoDelay);

  // Cleanup and return
  vpi_free_object(args_iter);
  return 0;
}

Also, a function that registers this system task is necessary. This function is invoked prior to elaboration or resolution of references when it is placed in the externally visible vlog_startup_routines[] array.

// Registers the increment system task
void register_increment(void) {
  s_vpi_systf_data data = {
    /* type */        vpiSysTask,
    /* sysfunctype */ vpiSysTask,
    /* tfname */      "$increment",
    /* calltf */      increment,
    /* compiletf */   NULL,
    /* sizetf */      NULL,
    /* user_data */   NULL
  };

  vpi_register_systf(&data);
}

// Contains a zero-terminated list of functions that have to be called at startup
void (*vlog_startup_routines[])(void) = {
  register_increment,
  NULL
};

The C code is compiled into a shared object that will be used by the Verilog simulator. A simulation of the earlier mentioned Verilog fragment will now result in the following output:

VPI routine received 41
After $increment, val=42

== See also ==
- SystemVerilog DPI

== Sources ==
- IEEE Xplore

=== Sources for Verilog VPI interface ===
- Teal, for C++
- JOVE, for Java
- Ruby-VPI, for Ruby
- ScriptEDA, for Perl, Python, Tcl
- Cocotb , for Python
- OrigenSim, for Ruby
