= Verisity =

Verisity was a startup company which developed software products for electronic design automation (EDA) verification, specifically of electronic systems and complex integrated circuits.

The company was Founded in 1995 by Yoav Hollander as "InSpec", and was later renamed to "Verisity" the headquarters of the company was in Mountainview, California

In the early 1990s microprocessors started becoming more complex, and standard validation and verification methods weren't sufficient. The cost of a bug in chip-design tape-out was huge, and better methods were needed.

For that purpose, the company developed a new domain-specific language named "e" (unrelated to the "E" language) that allows writing abstract tests using constrained randomized values, in order to create a large number of variants to any test. additionally, SPECMAN allowed the user to define coverage metrics and measure what was covered by the different tests

In 1998 Ziv Binyamini was appointed as Verisity's VP of R&D.

In 2005 Verisity was acquired by Cadence Design Systems at a valuation of $280M
