= Jacob K. White =

American electronics engineer and professor

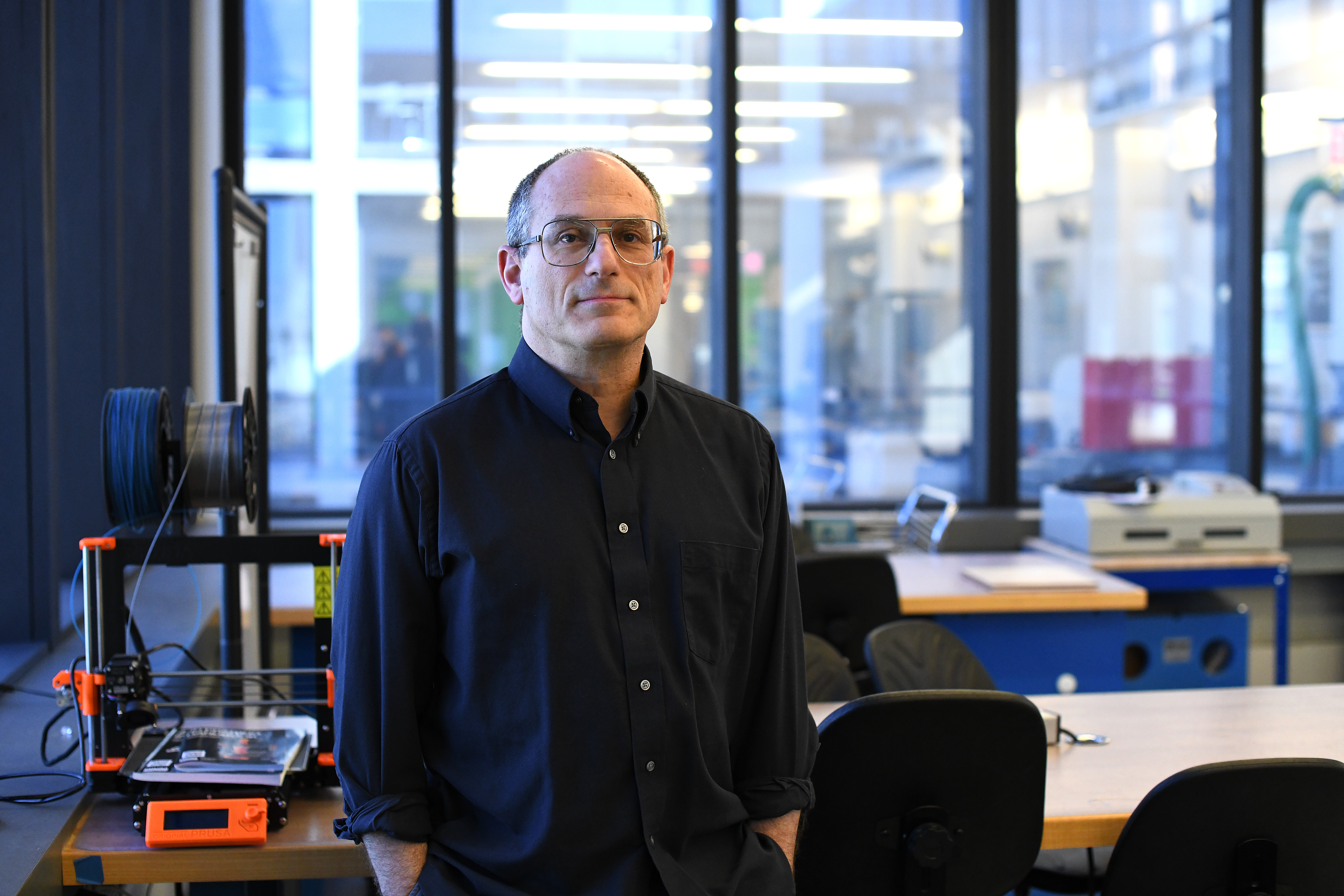
Jacob K. White in the Cypress Engineering Design Studio, Building 38, MIT Campus, Cambridge, MA. USA.

Jacob K. White is the Cecil H. Green Professor of Electrical Engineering and Computer Science at the Massachusetts Institute of Technology. He researches fast numerical algorithms for simulation, particularly the simulation of circuits. His work on the FASTCAP program for three-dimensional capacitance calculation and FASTHENRY, a program for three-dimensional inductance calculations, is highly cited. He has also done extensive work on steady-state simulation of analog and microwave circuits. White was a significant early contributor to the development of Spectre and SpectreRF. He is a Principal Investigator at the Research Laboratory of Electronics.

White received his Ph.D. from the University of California, Berkeley in 1985, working on waveform relaxation under advising professor Alberto Sangiovanni-Vincentelli. He worked for IBM prior to joining the MIT faculty.

White was made a Fellow of the IEEE in 2008 "for contributions to simulation tools for RF circuits, electrical interconnects, and micro machined devices." In 2022 he, along with Ricardo Telichevesky and Ken Kundert, was awarded the ACM/IEEE A. Richard Newton Technical Impact Award in Electronic Design Automation for their paper Efficient steady-state analysis based on matrix-free Krylov-subspace methods.
