= Waveform viewer =

A waveform viewer is a software tool for viewing the signal levels of either a digital or analog circuit design.

Waveform viewers comes in two varieties:

1. simulation waveform viewers for displaying signal levels of simulated design models, and
2. in-circuit waveform viewers for displaying signal levels captured in-circuit while debugging or testing hardware boards (see also waveform monitor)

== Simulation waveform viewers ==
In integrated circuit design, waveform viewers are typically used in conjunction with a simulation. A waveform view allows an IC designer to see the signal transitions over time and the relation of those signals with other signals in an IC design, which is typically written in a hardware description language. Simulators can be used to interactively capture wave data for immediate viewing on a waveform viewer; however, for integrated circuit design the usage model is typically to save the output of simulation runs by running batch jobs and to view the waveforms off-line as a static database.

Waveform viewers allow you to zoom in and out over a time sequence, and take measurements between two cursor points. In addition, the waveform view has many ways of displaying signal information, such as in hexadecimal, binary, or a symbolic value.

Most waveform viewers can read an industrial standard waveform database known as Value Change Dump (VCD) or a proprietary wave format. The proprietary wave formats usually have faster record and playback speeds or require smaller memory store space, or save additional signal information for viewing, such as bus transactions.

== In-circuit waveform viewers ==
These are built into most logic analyzer, data acquisition cards, and automatic test equipment. In-circuit waveform viewers are included with products from:

- Tektronix
- LabWindows/CVI
- Teradyne

== See also ==
- List of HDL simulators, such as such as VHDL, Verilog, SystemVerilog
