= Spectre Circuit Simulator =

SPICE-class circuit simulator

Spectre is a SPICE-class circuit simulator owned and distributed by the software company Cadence Design Systems. It provides the basic SPICE analyses and component models. It also supports the Verilog-A modeling language. Spectre comes in enhanced versions that also support RF simulation (SpectreRF) and mixed-signal simulation (AMS Designer). A massively parallel version, Spectre X, was also released to provide performance gains while maintaining the same accuracy as previous Spectre versions.

== Specifications ==
=== List of supported device models ===
- Advanced-node models, including the latest versions of the BSIM CMG, BSIM IMG, and UTSOI models
- MOSFET models, including the latest versions of the BSIM3, BSIM4, BSIM Bulk (BSIM6), PSP, and HiSIM
- High-voltage MOS models, including the latest versions of the HiSIM HV, MOS9, MOS11, and EKV
- Silicon on insulator (SOI), including latest versions of BTASOI, SSIMSOI, BSIMSOI, BSIMSOI PD, and HiSIM SOI
- Bipolar junction transistor (BJT) models, including the latest versions of VBIC, HICUM, Mextram, HBT, and Gummel-Poon models
- Diode models, including the diode, Phillips level 500, and CMC diode models
- JFET models, including the JFET, Phillips level 100 JFET, and Individual dual-gate JFET models
- IGBT models, including PSpice® IGBT model and HiSIM IGBT models
- Resistors, including linear resistor, diffused resistor, CMC two-terminal and three-terminal resistor, and physical resistor models
- GaAs MESFET models, includes latest versions of GaAs, TOM2, TOM3, and Angelov
- GaN MESFET models, including Angelov, ASM, and MVSG models
- Silicon TFT models, including RPI Poly-Silicon and Amorphous silicon Thin-Film models
- Verilog-A compact device models
- Z and S domain sources
- User-defined compiled model interface (CMI), allowing for the rapid inclusion of user-defined models
- Josephson Junctions
- Specialized reliability models (AgeMOS) for simulating the effect of HCI and BTI
- Miscellaneous power models, including the relay, transformer, non-linear magnetic core, and winding
- Miscellaneous RF models, including the DC block, DC feedthrough, and microstrip and stripline elements (bend, cross, corner, curve, open line, tee models)

=== Language and Netlist support ===
The netlist formats, behavioral modeling languages, parasitic netlist formats, and stimulus files are common across the Spectre Simulation Platform. Supported formats include:

1. Spectre and SPICE netlist formats
2. Spectre, SPICE, and PSpice models
3. Verilog-A 2.0 LRM-compliant behavioral models and structural netlists
4. DSPF/SPEF parasitic formats
5. S-parameter data files in Touchstone, CITI-file, and Spectre formats
6. SST2, PSF, PSF XL, and FSDB waveform formats
7. Digital vector (VEC), Verilog-Value Change Dump (VCD), Extended Verilog-Value Change Dump (EVCD), and digital stimulus

== History ==
Spectre was developed at Cadence Design Systems by Ken Kundert and Jacob K. White.
