= Design space verification =

Ensuring processes and their material inputs can scale to commercial requirements

Design space verification is defined by the European Medicines Agency as the verification that material inputs and processes are able to scale to commercial manufacturing levels while maintaining a standard of quality. Therefore, it is difficult to conduct design space verification while not operating at target levels and should be conducted over the manufacturing lifecycle. Changes in manufacturing output within the design space should not present any risks. Should the manufacturing load exceed the boundaries defined as normal operating ranges unanticipated scale-dependent issues can occur.

Design space verification is a part of process validation as defined by the EMA in conjunction with the FDA. Its purpose is to guarantee end product quality within a range of manufacturing boundaries. The effects of scale up activities should be fully understood by the manufacturer. Most initial design space conclusions are based upon laboratory testing or pilot batches with scale up effects being inferred by experimentation or based on statistical evidence, simulations, or studies. Ongoing design space verification should be dependent upon the results of an assessment of risk involved with scale up activities. More specifically, how scaling up production affects scale-dependent variables. Design space verification is much more focused in scope than overall process validation. Design space verification specifically aims to confirm output quality within a given operating range. This allows for changes in operating level flexibility while guaranteeing production quality, and allows for changes in production quantities without necessitating a reevaluation of the production process.
