= Programming language reference =

Documentation for users of a computer programming language

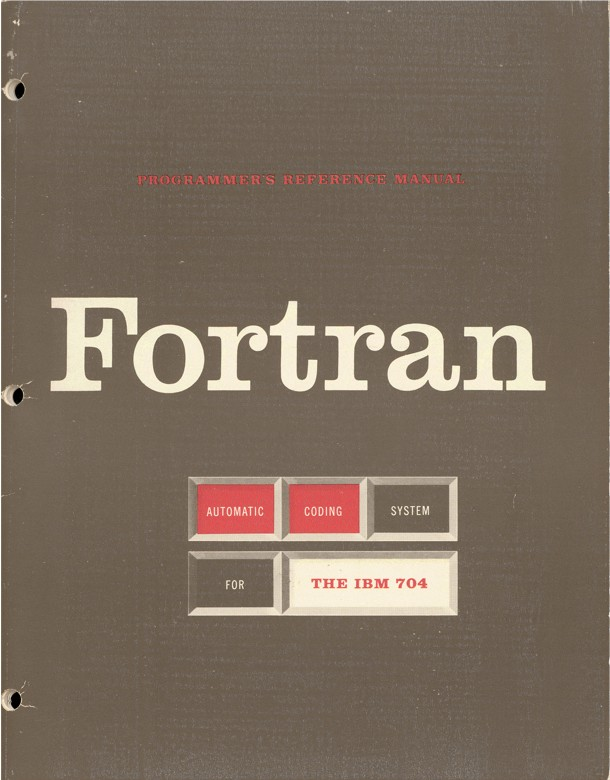
The Fortran Automatic Coding System for the IBM 704 (15 October 1956), the first Programmer's Reference Manual for Fortran

In computing, a programming language reference or language reference manual is part of the documentation associated with most mainstream programming languages. It is written for users and developers, and describes the basic elements of the language and how to use them in a program. For a command-based language, for example, this will include details of every available command and of the syntax for using it.

The reference manual is usually separate and distinct from a more detailed programming language specification meant for implementors of the language rather than those who simply use it to accomplish some processing task.

There may also be a separate introductory guide aimed at giving newcomers enough information to start writing programs, after which they can consult the reference manual for full details. Frequently, however, a single publication contains both the introductory material and the language reference.
