= Phil Moorby =

British engineer and computer scientist

Phil Moorby (April 25, 1953 – September 15, 2022) was a British engineer and computer scientist. Moorby was born and brought up in Birmingham, England, and studied Mathematics at Southampton University, England. Moorby received his master's degree in computer science from Manchester University, England, in 1974. He moved to the United States in 1983.

While working in Gateway Design Automation, in 1984 he invented the Verilog hardware description language, and developed the first and industry standard simulator Verilog-XL. In 1990 Gateway was purchased by Cadence Design Systems.

In 1997, Moorby joined startup company SynaPix, where he worked on match moving and video tracking algorithms for automatically extracting 3D models from video frames, using techniques such as optical flow, motion field and point clouds.

Moorby joined Co-Design Automation in 1999, and in 2002 he joined Synopsys to work on SystemVerilog verification language.

On October 10, 2005, Moorby became the recipient of the 2005 Phil Kaufman Award for his contributions to the EDA industry, specifically for development and popularization of Verilog, one of the world's most popular tools of electronic design automation.

In April 2016, Moorby was made a Fellow of the Computer History Museum, "for his invention and promotion of the Verilog hardware description language."

Philip Raymond Moorby died on September 15, 2022 at the age of 69 in Rockport, MA.
