= Value change dump =

Format for dumpfiles generated by EDA logic simulation tools

Value change dump (VCD) (also known less commonly as "variable change dump") is an ASCII-based format for dumpfiles generated by EDA logic simulation tools. The standard, four-value VCD format was defined along with the Verilog hardware description language by the IEEE Standard 1364-1995 in 1996. An extended VCD format defined six years later in the IEEE standard 1364-2001 supports the logging of signal strength and directionality. The simple and yet compact structure of the VCD format has allowed its use to become ubiquitous and to spread into non-Verilog tools such as the VHDL simulator GHDL and various kernel tracers. A limitation of the format is that it is unable to record the values that are stored in memories.

== Structure/syntax ==
The VCD file comprises a header section with date, simulator, and timescale information; a variable definition section; and a value change section, in that order. The sections are not explicitly delineated within the file, but are identified by the inclusion of keywords belonging to each respective section.

VCD keywords are marked by a leading $; in general every keyword starts a command which is terminated by an explicit $end. Variable identifiers may also start with a $, but these may be distinguished by context.

All VCD tokens are delineated by whitespace. Data in the VCD file is case sensitive.

=== Header section ===
The header section of the VCD file includes a timestamp, a simulator version number, and a timescale, which maps the time increments listed in the value change section to simulation time units.

=== Variable definition section ===
The variable definition section of the VCD file contains scope information as well as lists of signals instantiated in a given scope.

Each variable is assigned an arbitrary identifier for use in the value change section. The identifier is composed of one or more printable ASCII characters from ! to ~ (decimal 33 to 126), these are conventionally kept short (i.e. one or two characters). Several variables can share an identifier if the simulator determines that they will always have the same value, i.e. are the same wire in the scope of the overall netlist.

The scope type definitions closely follow Verilog concepts, and include the types module, task, function, and fork.

=== $dumpvars section ===
The section beginning with $dumpvars keyword contains initial values of all variables dumped.

=== Value change section ===
The value change section contains a series of time-ordered value changes for the signals in a given simulation model. The current time is indicated by '#' followed by the timestamp. For scalar (single bit) signal the format is signal value denoted by 0 or 1 followed immediately by the signal identifier with no space between the value and the signal identifier. For vector (multi-bit) signals the format is signal value denoted by letter 'b' or 'B' followed by the value in binary format followed by space and then the signal identifier. Value for real variables is denoted by letter 'r' or 'R' followed by the data using %.16g printf() format followed by space and then the variable identifier.

== Example VCD file ==
$date
   Date text. For example: November 11, 2009.
$end
$version
   VCD generator tool version info text.
$end
$comment
   Any comment text.
$end
$timescale 1ps $end
$scope module logic $end
$var wire 8 # data $end
$var wire 1 $ data_valid $end
$var wire 1 % en $end
$var wire 1 & rx_en $end
$var wire 1 ' tx_en $end
$var wire 1 ( empty $end
$var wire 1 ) underrun $end
$upscope $end
$enddefinitions $end
$dumpvars
bxxxxxxxx #
x$
0%
x&
x'
1(
0)
$end
#0
b10000001 #
0$
1%
0&
1'
0(
0)
#2211
0'
#2296
b0 #
1$
#2302
0$
#2303

The code above defines 7 signals by using $var:

$var type bitwidth id name

The id is used later on the value change dump. The value change dump starts after $enddefinitions $end and is based on timestamps. Timestamp is denoted as '#' followed by number. On each timestamp the list of signals that change their value is listed. This is done by the value/id pair:

new_value id

This example will be displayed as

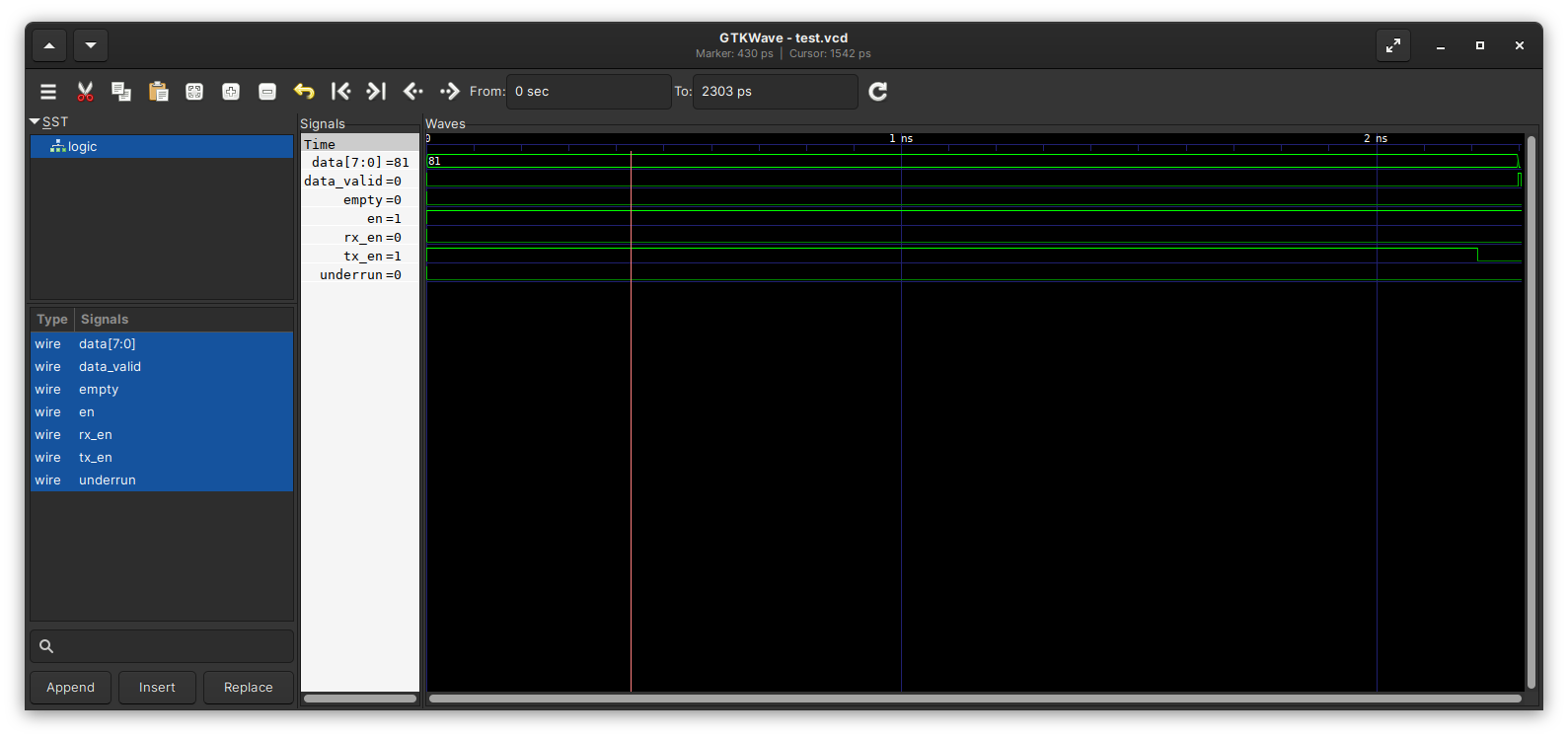
An example VCD file displayed by GTKWave.

== See also ==
- Waveform viewer
