= AWR =

AWR may refer to:

- Adventist World Radio, a Christian radio service
- Antarctic Wildlife Research Fund, an organisation that funds research into Antarctic ecology
- Australian Women's Register, an online database
- Automatic Workload Repository in Oracle Databases
- AWR Corporation, an electronic design automation software company
