= Faysal Sohail =

American businessman

Faysal A. Sohail
- Born: 1963 (age 62–63); Al Khobar, Saudi Arabia
- Education: BS Computer Engineering
- Alma mater: University of Illinois, Urbana-Champaign
- Occupations: -Managing Director -Entrepreneur -Venture Capitalist
- Spouse: Shazia Sohail
- Children: 4

Faysal A. Sohail (born December 1963) is an American venture capitalist and Managing Director at Presidio Partners in San Francisco. Sohail was a co-founder of Silicon Architects and on the founding team of Actel Corporation, two influential companies in the computer chip industry. Sohail serves as the Chairman of the Advisory Board of InoBat Auto, a European electric vehicle battery producer. In addition to that, he holds the position of Chairman of the Board at Our Next Energy (ONE), and serves as a board member for both Ascend Elements, and Wildcat Discovery Technologies, focusing on the sustainable energy sector.

== Early life and education ==
Sohail was born in Al Khobar, Saudi Arabia to Rashid Sohail and Anjam Sohail. Rashid Sohail, his father, was a prominent executive with Saudi Aramco in the Dhahran office, a position he held for nearly 30 years. Anjam Sohail, his mother, is the elder sister of deceased nuclear scientist, Dr Mujaddid Ahmad Ijaz. Sohail attended high school both in Saudi Arabia and the U.S. including The Miller School of Albemarle in Virginia. Sohail attended the University of Illinois, Urbana-Champaign, where he earned his Bachelor of Science degree in Computer Engineering in 1985 and was a James Scholar. He also took graduate classes at Stanford University and consulted for Professor Abbas El Gamal at Stanford.

== Career ==
=== LSI Corporation and Actel Corporation ===
Sohail spent his early career working in integrated circuit (IC) design engineering and marketing at LSI Corporation and Actel Corporation During Sohail’s tenure, Actel developed breakthrough technology in the form of field-programmable gate array (FPGA) semiconductor chips. FPGA technology enabled creation of electronic products at a low cost, and to be reconfigured in the field when needed as opposed to sending them to a manufacturer for fabrication. Development of this technology revolutionized the chip market and created a worldwide $3 billion industry.

=== Silicon Architects ===
In 1990 Sohail co-founded Silicon Architects, a company that pioneered the complex Structured ASIC (application-specific integrated circuits) Methodology called Cell-Based Array (CBA). The ASIC architecture was considered the new design technology of choice to develop very complex ASICs for cutting-edge applications such as multimedia, graphics and telecommunications. Silicon Architects was one of the first Silicon intellectual property companies. They designed the fundamentals of computer chips, creating a platform on which companies could build chips with higher performance that used lower power, and then licensed the technology. Synopsys Inc. acquired Silicon Architects in 1995. Sohail worked for Synopsys as Senior Vice President of the Intellectual Property group and then as Senior Vice President of Corporate Strategy.

In 1999, Sohail became CEO of Cadabra Design Automation and oversaw its acquisition by Numerical Technologies where he served as Senior Vice President of Worldwide Field Operations. Cadabra Design Automation is known for providing automated transistor layout (ATL) tools to enable the manufacturing of newer, smaller chips, dramatically increasing their functionality, density and productivity.

=== Our Next Energy (ONE) ===
In 2020, Sohail became a part of Our Next Energy (ONE), a Michigan-based company that focuses on innovative energy storage solutions, as a Board Member. During this, the company released a technology that offers an alternative solution in energy storage with a focus on safety, energy density, and cycle life. After being a founding board member for years, he moved into the role of chairman of the board in 2023.

=== Ascend Elements ===
In 2022, Sohail joined Ascend Elements, a company focused on battery recycling solutions, as a member of the board. This contributed to creating and innovating a more sustainable supply chain for battery materials, like Hydro to Cathode.

=== Wildcat Discovery Technologies ===
In 2018, Sohail became the Chairman of The Board for Wildcat Discovery Technologies, which accelerates the discovery of new materials for energy applications, with a focus on the development of advanced materials for rechargeable and primary batteries.

=== InoBat Auto ===
In 2019, Sohail co-founded InoBat Auto an electric vehicle battery producer located in the heart of Europe, with Venture Capitalist Marian Bocek. The company is set to produce world-first 'intelligent' batteries through a combination of AI and High Throughput technology. The batteries can be customised to any electric vehicle. He is also now the Technical Advisory Board Chair

=== Presidio Partners ===
Sohail joined Presidio Partners, formerly known as CMEA Capital, as Managing Director in 2002. Presidio is a venture capital firm focused on life sciences, high technology, and energy & materials investments. Founded in 1989, CMEA has been an early stage investor in many Silicon Valley high technology companies, including Flextronics, Magma, Maxygen, Monogram Biosciences, Silicon Spice, Symyx, and Syrrx.

While at Presidio, Sohail helped raise and deploy over $400 million while managing over $1 billion in assets. Presidio led investment in Applied Wave Research (AWR), a software company that develops microwave/RF design tools for high speed systems and Integrated Circuits; and A123 Systems, the largest IPO in the U.S. in 2009. A123 Systems developed groundbreaking battery technology that enabled safer, higher power batteries for use in electric cars, and is one of the leading lithium-ion battery manufacturing companies in the world.

Sohail served on the College of Engineering Advisory Board (CEAB) at his alma mater, the University of Illinois, Urbana-Champaign. He also sits on the Board of AWR Corporation, AirTight Networks, Danotek Motions Technologies, Evolution Robotics, and MultiGiG, Inc., Solaria, IndoUS Venture Partners, and previously served on the Board of Directors of Alien Technology.

== Philanthropy ==
Faysal is a board member of the American Pakistan Foundation (APF), an organization co-founded by Hillary Clinton in order to "effectively catalyze long-term economic development and social change in Pakistan".

=== Education ===
Sohail is Chairman of the Board of the Silicon Valley Education Foundation, a nonprofit organization that joins business and community leaders to improve public education in Silicon Valley and increase the number of college-bound and prepared students in the area. The Foundation focuses on advancing student performance in math and science in Santa Clara school districts.

=== Global Entrepreneurship ===
In 2010, Sohail accompanied then California Governor Arnold Schwarzenegger to Moscow to meet with Russian President Dmitry Medvedev to encourage entrepreneurial investments and share his thoughts and experience in financing innovation.

Sohail was chosen as one of 11 delegates for the U.S. Department of State’s Global Entrepreneurship Program, created to promote entrepreneurship around the world. The delegation was focused on growing entrepreneurship and building relationships in the Middle East/North Africa, particularly in Egypt.

On June 15, 2011, the US Jakarta-Indonesia Embassy issued a press release naming Sohail as one of 13 members of an Entrepreneurship Delegation set to visit Indonesia July 19–24, 2011. According to the press release, "The Entrepreneurship Delegation will enhance U.S. and Indonesian efforts to promote entrepreneurship and strengthen business ties...”

Sohail is also a Charter Member of OPEN in Silicon Valley, an organization committed to promoting entrepreneurship and business leadership in the Pakistani-American community.

== Recognition ==
Sohail was named the 2011 Pioneer Business Leader by the Silicon Valley Education Foundation. This award is given to business leaders who have contributed to the improvement of education in the Silicon Valley. Previous awardees include John Chambers, chairman and CEO of Cisco.

== Personal life ==
Sohail lives in Hillsborough, California with his wife Shazia Sohail and four children.
