= Joseph Costello (software executive) =

- Born: December 6, 1953 (age 72); United States
- Occupation: Executive

Joseph Ball Costello (born December 6, 1953) is an American executive in the electronic design automation (EDA) industry. He was president and COO of SDA Systems from 1987–1988 and CEO of Cadence Design Systems, which became the largest EDA company under his tenure, from 1988–1997. He previously served on the Board of Directors of Oracle and Adobe and was widely considered to be a top candidate to replace Steve Jobs as CEO of Apple

== Education ==
Joseph received his B.S. in Physics in 1974 from Harvey Mudd College. He also has a master's degree in Physics from both Yale and UC Berkeley. He started his career at National Semiconductor, which he soon left to found the "Electronic Speech Systems" company.

== Career ==
He entered the EDA industry when James Solomon invited him to SDA Systems, where he rapidly rose to senior management. While Joseph was President of SDA, it merged with ECAD to become Cadence Design Systems.

In 2001, Joseph gave the commencement address at Harvey Mudd, two days after the sudden death of Douglas Adams, who had been scheduled to speak.

He was formerly the CEO of think3, a product lifecycle management software and consulting company, and of Orb Networks. He is currently the CEO of Enlighted.

He also served as chairman of Barcelona Design, BravoBrava!, Soliloquy Learning, Zamba and on the board of directors of Santa Cruz Networks and Oasys Design Systems.

== Awards ==
In 2004, he was awarded the Phil Kaufman Award in recognition of his business contributions that helped grow the EDA industry.
