= Corporate Technology Directory =

The Corporate Technology Directory also known as the CorpTech directory of technology companies was a directory of technology companies published from 1986 to 2004 by CorpTech. It listed thousands of technology companies including software, services, and hardware as well as developers.

The directory was later made available in digital form as a cd and subsequently database subscription.

== See also ==
- Major Information Technology Companies of the World
