= Sonic Focus =

Sonic Focus (part of Synopsys)
- Industry: Audio technology Audio engineering
- Founded: United States (1995)
- Founder: Tom Paddock; Jim Barber
- Headquarters: South Lake Tahoe, California, U.S.
- Area served: Worldwide
- Key people: Tom Paddock (CEO)

Sonic Focus Inc was a software development company located in South Lake Tahoe, California. It was founded in 1995 with the aim of improving the quality of live concerts broadcast over the Web. It later provided audio post processing technologies that recreate the original sound of digital recordings which have been reduced in quality by compression. Their products can be used to enhance the sound in many electronic products, including mobile phones, car audio, PCs, laptops, MP3 players, TVs and home theatre systems.

In early 2008, Sonic Focus was acquired by ARC International, a provider of consumer intellectual property to OEM and semiconductor companies. In 2009 ARC International was acquired by Virage Logic Corporation. In September, 2010, Virage Logic was acquired by Synopsys Inc.

== Products ==
- Adaptive Dynamics - helps restore clarity and fidelity of compressed audio in music, movies and games.
- X-Matrix - creates a surround-sound environment on stereo speakers or headphones.
- Extrapolator - expands stereo audio to a multi-channel sound stage using physical modelling techniques.
- Virtual Bass - significantly enhances bass response of speakers with limited ability to produce bass without compromising voice integrity or detail.
