= Cigital =

American software company

- Type: Public
- Industry: software security
- Founded: 1992, as Reliable Software Technologies, renamed in 2000 to Cigital
- Fate: acquired by Synopsys
- Headquarters: Mountain View, CA, Dulles, VA, U. S.
- Number of locations: Atlanta, Bangalore, Bloomington, Boston, Chicago, Dallas, Minneapolis, New York, Santa Clara, Seattle, London
- Area served: Worldwide
- Key people: Gary McGraw
- Services: Architecture Analysis, Ethical Hacking, Penetration Testing, Static Analysis, Training, Policy Development
- Owner: Public Company
- Number of employees: 400 security consultants
- Parent: Synopsys
- Website: https://www.synopsys.com/software-integrity.html

Cigital was a software security managed services firm based in Dulles, VA. The services they offered included application security testing, penetration testing, and architecture analysis. Cigital also provided instructor-led security training and products such as SecureAssist, a static analysis tool that acts as an application security spellchecker for developers.

== History ==
Cigital was established in 1992 with grants from DARPA. In 1999 the firm created ITS4, which according to Cigital, was the world's first static analysis tool. The technology in this product was eventually licensed to Kleiner Perkins and used as the basis for the creation of Fortify Software in 2003. In 2010, Fortify was acquired by Hewlett Packard for $300 million.

BSIMM (Build Security In Maturity Model) is a software security measurement framework that helps organizations compare their software security to other organizations. BSIMM was started as a joint project by Cigital and Fortify Software.

In 2002, Cigital announced finding a vulnerability in Visual C++ .Net compiler (related to a GS compiler flag being inefficient). Cigital was criticized for not following responsible disclosure in this case, however, Cigital has defended its position due to the nature of the vulnerability.

On November 30, 2016, Cigital was acquired by Synopsys, an electronic design automation company.

== Acquisitions ==
In November 2014, Cigital acquired IViz Security, an information security company in the field of on-demand application penetration testing.

In November 2016, it was announced that Synopsys, Inc. would be acquiring Cigital and Codiscope.
