= Scald =

A scald is a type of burn injury caused by hot liquids or gases. It can also refer to:

== Produce and drinks ==
- Scald (barley), common disease of barley in temperate regions
- Apple scald, a disorder in the storage of apples
- Pear scald, a disorder in the storage of pears
- Scalded milk, milk heated to just below its boiling point

== Computing and technology ==
- SCALD, structured computer-aided logic design system

== Music ==
- Skáld (band), a French Nordic folk group

== See also ==
- Skald
