= Magma Design Automation =

Former electronic design automation company

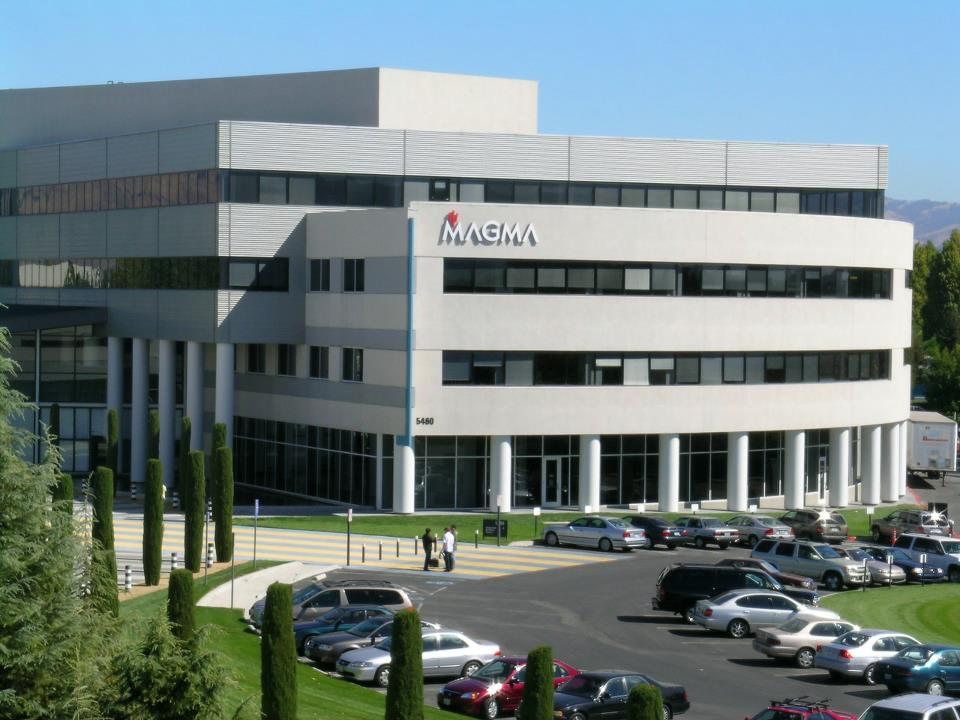
- Headquarters at Santa Clara, California
- Type: Public
- Industry: Software & Programming
- Founded: April 1, 1997; 29 years ago in Mountain View, California
- Founder: Lukas van Ginneken; Rajeev Madhavan; Hamid Savoj; Karen Vahtra
- Defunct: February 22, 2012
- Fate: Acquired by Synopsys
- Headquarters: San Jose, California
- Key people: Rajeev Madhavan (CEO); Roy Jewell, President
- Revenue: $139.3 million USD (FY 2011)
- Number of employees: 696 (1 May 2011)
- Website: www.magma-da.com

Magma Design Automation was a software company in the electronic design automation (EDA) industry. The company was founded in 1997 and maintained headquarters in San Jose, California, with facilities throughout North America, Europe and Asia. Magma software products were used in major elements of integrated circuit design, including: synthesis, placement, routing, power management, circuit simulation, verification and analog/mixed-signal design.

Magma was acquired by Synopsys in a merger finalized February 22, 2012 at a cash value of about $523 million, or $7.35 per share.

== History ==
Magma was founded in 1997 by a team including Rajeev Madhavan, who was chairman, CEO and president from the company's inception. The company initially competed primarily with Cadence and Avanti Corporation in physical design but eventually broadened its product portfolio and competed with all three of the largest established EDA companies: Cadence, Mentor Graphics and Synopsys. Magma had a particularly strong presence in the convergence device segment through key customers such as Qualcomm, Broadcom and Texas Instruments. In 2001 Roy Jewell joined Magma as chief operating officer and later that year added the title of president.

Magma completed an initial public offering on Nasdaq, under the ticker symbol LAVA, on November 20, 2001 — the last EDA company to go public — and achieved its peak annual revenue of $214.4 million in its 2008 fiscal year. Magma was the fourth largest EDA company by revenue.

In 2002 Magma was named to the Red Herring 100 for innovation and business strategy. In 2005 Forbes ranked Magma No. 2 on its list of fastest-growing technology companies.

=== Patent Dispute ===
Magma was involved in a legal dispute with Synopsys beginning in September 2004, when Synopsys sued Magma for allegedly infringing two patents. Claims and counter-claims accelerated, resulting in separate court cases in California and Delaware, and a number of disputed patents. On March 29, 2007, Magma and Synopsys announced the companies had agreed to settle all pending litigation between them. As part of the settlement Magma made a $12.5 million payment to Synopsys and each company cross-licensed four previously disputed patents to the other.

== Synopsys acquisition ==
On November 30, 2011, Magma and Synopsys announced they had entered into a definitive agreement by which Synopsys would buy Magma for $507 million US$. The merger was finalized on February 22, 2012, with cash value of the transaction at about $523 million, or $7.35 per Magma share.
