= Sigrity =

Sigrity, Inc.
- Type: Private
- Industry: Software & Programming
- Founded: 1997
- Founders: Dr. Jiayuan Fang, President/CEO and Founder Raymond Chen, SVP Engineering and Co-Founder
- Fate: Acquired
- Successor: Cadence Design Systems
- Headquarters: Santa Clara, California
- Website: www.cadence.com

Sigrity, acquired by Cadence Design Systems in 2012 for $80M, supplies software for IC package physical design and for analyzing power integrity, signal integrity and design stage electromagnetic interference (EMI). Analysis is performed on chips, IC packages and printed circuit boards.

== Overview ==
Sigrity began operations with a 1997 award from the National Science Foundation for simulation using electromagnetic computation techniques targeting electronic structures with hybrid solver techniques. The IC package physical layout product line was acquired from Synopsys in 2006.

The 2017 revision of Cadence’s Sigrity product introduces several features specifically designed to speed up PCB power and signal integrity signoff. In 2016, Cadence expanded the portfolio with an upgraded serial link analysis flow including an IBIS-AMI modeling-building technology, USB 3.1 (Gen 2) compliance kit, and cut-and-stitch model extraction technology to segment long serial links into sections that should be modeled using 3D full-wave and sections that can be modeled using hybrid extraction technology. In 2015, Cadence released the Sigrity Parallel Computing 4-pack which enabled efficient product creation with 3X speedup in signoff-accurate PCB extraction, an updated power-aware system signal integrity (SI) feature which supports LPDDR4 analysis with full JEDEC compliance checking, and flexible licensing options.

== Products ==
- Sigrity OptimizePI
- Sigrity PowerDC
- Sigrity XtractIM
- Sigrity PowerSI
- Sigrity Broadband SPICE
- Sigrity SPEED2000
- Sigrity XcitePI Extraction
- Sigrity SystemSI
- Sigrity System Explorer
- Sigrity Transistor-to-Behavioral Model Conversion (T2B)
- Allegro Sigrity SI Base
- Allegro Sigrity PI Base
