= James Solomon =

James Solomon may refer to:

- James Solomon (engineer) (born 1936), American engineer
- James Solomon (politician) (born 1984), American politician and mayor of Jersey City
