= Tara Javidi =

Iranian electrical engineer and computer scientist

Tara Javidi is an Iranian electrical engineer and computer scientist who studies networked information, stochastic control, machine learning, hypothesis testing, network optimization, and network routing, among other topics. She is a professor of electrical and computer engineering at the University of California, San Diego, where she co-directs the Center for Machine-Integrated Computing and Security with Farinaz Koushanfar.

== Education and career ==
Javidi graduated from Sharif University of Technology in 1996, and earned two MS degrees and a PhD from the University of Michigan in 2002. Her dissertation, Optimal Resource Allocation: Issues and Applications, was supervised by Demosthenis Teneketzis.

She became an assistant professor of electrical engineering at the University of Washington in 2002 before moving to her present position at the University of California, San Diego in 2005. She was promoted to full professor in 2016.

== Recognition ==
Javidi was named a Fellow of the IEEE in 2021, "for contributions to stochastic resource allocation and active hypothesis testing". In 2020, the University of Michigan Department of Electrical and Computer Engineering recognized her with their Distinguished Educator Award, for her "significant and lasting impact in education".
