= ECAD (disambiguation) =

Electronic computer-aided design is a category of software tools for designing electronic systems.

ECAD may also refer to:

- ECAD, Inc., an electronic design automation company that became part of Cadence Design Systems
- ECAD (Brazil), the Brazilian music licensing organisation
