= Demosthenis Teneketzis =

Electrical engineer

- Born: November 5, 1951 (age 74); Drama, Greece
- Education: Massachusetts Institute of Technology
- Known for: Control Theory, Decentralized Systems, Networks, Diagnosis in Discrete Event Systems
- Scientific career
- Fields: Control Theory, Decentralized Systems, Networks, Discrete Event Systems
- Workplaces: The University of Michigan
- Thesis: Communication in decentralized control (1979)
- Doctoral advisor: Nils R. Sandell Jr, MIT
- Doctoral students: Tara Javidi

Demosthenis Teneketzis (Greek: Δημοσθένης Τενεκετζής) IEEE is a Greek-American electrical engineer specializing in Systems Science and Engineering. He is Professor Emeritus in the Department of Electrical Engineering and Computer Science at the University of Michigan, Ann Arbor. His works are in the fields of control, decentralized systems, and networks. His main research publications are in stochastic control (centralized and decentralized), scheduling and resource allocation in networks with strategic and non-strategic users, and fault diagnosis in discrete event systems. He is a Fellow of IEEE for contributions to the theory of decentralized information systems and stochastic control.

== Research ==
Demosthenis Teneketzis’ research is on Stochastic Control, Decentralized Decision-Making with non-strategic decision-makers (teams) or strategic decision-makers (games), resource allocation in networks with centralized or decentralized information and strategic or non-strategic agents, and fault diagnosis in discrete event systems. In 2015 he received the George S. Axelby Award from the IEEE Control Systems Society for his paper "Decentralized Stochastic Control with Partial History Sharing: A Common Information Approach".

== Selected publications ==
- Nayyar A, Mahajan A, Teneketzis D. Decentralized stochastic control with partial history sharing: A common information approach. IEEE Transactions on Automatic Control. 2013 Jul 10;58(7):1644-58.
- Agrawal R, Teneketzis D, Anantharam V. Asymptotically efficient adaptive allocation schemes for controlled Markov chains: Finite parameter space. IEEE Transactions on Automatic Control. 1989 Dec.:1249-1259.
- Sampath M, Sengupta R, Lafortune S, Sinnamohideen K, Teneketzis D. Diagnosability of discrete-event systems. IEEE Transactions on automatic control. 1995 Sep;40(9):1555-75.
- Andersland MS, Teneketzis D. Information structures, causality, and nonsequential stochastic control I: design-independent properties. SIAM journal on control and optimization. 1992 Nov;30(6):1447-75.
- Washburn RB, Teneketzis D. Asymptotic agreement among communicating decision makers. Stochastics: An International Journal of Probability and Stochastic Processes. 1984 Jan 1;13(1-2):103-29.
- Farhadi F, Golestani SJ, Teneketzis D. A surrogate optimization-based mechanism for resource allocation and routing in networks with strategic agents. IEEE Transactions on Automatic Control. 2019 Feb;64(2):464-79.
