= Cadence Design Systems, Inc. v. Avanti Corp =

Legal battle between two semiconductor companies

Cadence Design Systems, Inc. v. Avanti Corp was a major legal battle between two semiconductor companies, Cadence Design Systems and Avanti Corporation, that lasted for more than six years, and was fought over stolen technology.

The criminal case concluded with Avanti executives pleading no contest to trade-secret theft, conspiracy to commit trade-secret theft, receiving stolen property, and securities fraud, and several receiving jail time. To acquire Avanti, Synopsys paid about $55 million in golden handshake payments to these same executives. Synopsys then paid an additional $265 million to Cadence to settle the remaining civil suit and $26.1 million to Silvaco to settle two of three Silvaco's suits against Meta Software and its president filed in 1995 and inherited by Avanti. The case resulted in a number of legal precedents.

== Case history ==
Avanti was a defendant in a long-running legal battle with Cadence Design Systems, of which BusinessWeek said "The Avant! case is probably the most dramatic tale of white-collar crime in the history of Silicon Valley." In this case, Cadence and the district attorney claimed that Avanti was founded on stolen Cadence code, and Avanti denied it.

The case started when a Cadence engineer noticed that the Avanti code exactly reproduced a particular bug that Cadence code exhibited earlier. After finding more similarities, Cadence called the district attorney, Julius Finkelstein. Finkelstein, who was a computer science major and interested in white collar crime, got a warrant. A search revealed considerable Cadence code on Avanti computers and those of consultants it had hired.

The ensuing legal battle lasted for more than six years. Cadence would get an injunction against a particular Avanti product, and Avanti would promptly replace it with one with a new name. Cadence would claim this new product was still tainted, and the battle continued.

However, this was also a criminal case as well as a civil case, and eventually it came to trial. At this point the Avanti executives (Gerald Hsu and six others) pleaded no contest to charges of trade secret theft, conspiracy to commit trade secret theft, receiving stolen property, and securities fraud. Avanti and the executives paid at this point about $195 million in restitution to Cadence with an additional $40+ million in fines personally to the State. Of the six defendants,

- One was completely exonerated with no criminal record.
- One served a three month probation, with a misdemeanor record.
- Three served some time in a minimal security facility, working half the time outside, and receiving a criminal record.
- One served time in San Quentin, then transferred to a minimal security facility, with a criminal record.

This cleared the way for the civil suit to proceed. During this litigation, Avanti was bought by Synopsys, which paid Cadence about $265 million more to end all litigation. Soon after the settlement, in Cadence Design Systems, Inc. v. Avant! Corp., 29 Cal. 4th 215, 57 P.3d 647, 127 Cal. Rptr. 2d 169 (2002), the California Supreme Court upheld the lower court's earlier decision.

Synopsys then paid an additional $26.1 million to Silvaco to settle two of three Silvaco's suits against Meta Software, earlier purchased by Avanti, and its president. The lawsuits were filed in 1995 and inherited by Avanti.
