= List of the largest software companies =

Many lists exist that provide an overview of large software companies, often called "independent software vendors" ("ISVs"), in the world. The lists differ by methodology of composition and consequently show substantial differences in both the listed companies and the ranking of those companies.

== Forbes Global 2000 ==
The Forbes Global 2000 is an annual ranking of the top 2000 public companies in the world by Forbes magazine, based on a mix of four metrics: sales, profit, assets, and market value. The Forbes list for software companies includes only pure-play (or nearly pure-play) software companies and excludes manufacturers, consumer electronics companies, conglomerates, IT consulting firms, and computer services companies, even if they have large software divisions.

The top 50 companies in terms of market capitalization in the 2025 Forbes list for the "Software & Programming" industry are listed in the following table (ranked by market capitalization):

Rank	Organization	Revenue (B$)	Year	Market cap (B$)	Headquarters
1	Microsoft	261.8	2025	2,913	Redmond, Washington, US
2	Alphabet	359.3	2025	1,973	Mountain View, California, US
3	Oracle	55.78	2025	388.36	Austin, Texas, US
4	SAP	37.73	2025	324.53	Walldorf, Germany
5	Palantir Technologies	2.87	2025	264.5	Denver, Colorado, US
6	Salesforce	37.9	2025	257.4	San Francisco, California, US
7	IBM	62.83	2025	215.15	Armonk, New York, US
8	ServiceNow	11.47	2025	195.67	Santa Clara, California, US
9	Intuit	17.17	2025	174.48	Palo Alto, California, US
10	Adobe	22.04	2025	156.72	San Jose, California, US
11	Palo Alto Networks	8.57	2025	118.15	Santa Clara, California, US
12	ADP	18.9	2024	103.28	Roseland, New Jersey, US
13	Fiserv	20.7	2025	99.16	Brookfield, Wisconsin, US
14	Synopsys	6.14	2024	86.45	Sunnyvale, California, US
15	Crowdstrike	3.06	2024	84.12	Austin, Texas, US
16	Cadence Design Systems	4.64	2025	79.45	San Jose, California, US
17	PayPal	30.43	2024	67.45	San Jose, California US
18	Workday	8.42	2025	63.72	Pleasanton, California, US
19	Roper Technologies	7.04	2025	59.9	Sarasota, Florida, US
20	Atlassian	4.79	2025	59.9	Sydney, Australia
21	Snowflake Inc.	3.63	2025	52.92	Bozeman, Montana, US
22	Dassault Systèmes	6.75	2025	48.61	Vélizy-Villacoublay, France
23	Autodesk	5.45	2024	47.66	San Rafael, California, US
24	Paychex	5.2	2024	45.23	Rochester, New York, US
25	Block, Inc.	22.88	2024	44.6	San Francisco, California, US
26	Fortinet	2.6	2023	45.6	Santa Clara, California, US
27	CoStar Group	2.46	2023	31.1	Washington D.C., US
28	Hubspot	2.17	2023	30.4	Cambridge, Massachusetts, US
29	Veeva Systems	2.4	2023	29.7	Pleasanton, California, US
30	Global Payments	10.11	2025	17.19	Atlanta, Georgia, US
31	Corpay	3.98	2025	22.62	Atlanta, Georgia, US
32	Ansys	2.54	2025	28.11	Canonsburg, Pennsylvania, US
33	Splunk	2.4	2020	24.4	San Francisco, California, US
34	Zoom	4.67	2025	23.21	San Jose, California, US
35	Akamai Technologies	3.2	2020	17.0	Boston, Massachusetts, US
36	Broadridge Financial Solutions	4.8	2020	16.96	New York City, New York, US
37	Gen Digital	3.7	2023	15.5	Tempe, Arizona, US and Prague, Czech Republic
38	SS&C Technologies	5.96	2025	17.91	Windsor, Connecticut, US
39	Citrix Systems	3.4	2023	13.2	Fort Lauderdale, Florida, US
40	NetApp	6.51	2025	18.25	San Jose, California, US
41	EPAM Systems	2.7	2023	10.3	Newtown, Bucks County, Pennsylvania, US
42	DocuSign	2.5	2023	10.1	San Francisco, California, US
43	Twilio	4.2	2023	9.8	San Francisco, California, US
44	Amdocs	4.9	2023	8.9	Chesterfield, Missouri, US
45	Paycom	1.5	2023	8.5	Oklahoma City, Oklahoma, US
46	Kyndryl	16.1	2023	6.0	New York City, New York, US
47	RingCentral	2.2	2023	3.2	Belmont, California, US
48	MongoDB	1.7	2023	25.6	New York City, New York, US
49	Unity Technologies	1.2	2022	35.3	San Francisco, California, US
50	Okta	1.2	2022	16.3	San Francisco, California, US
49	Datadog	2.68	2025	35.0	New York City, New York, US

All values listed in the table are in billion US$.

== See also ==
- List of largest technology companies by revenue
- List of largest manufacturing companies by revenue
- List of largest United States–based employers globally
- List of largest employers
- Economy of the United States
- List of Indian IT companies
