= Virage Logic =

American electronics company

Virage Logic Corporation
- Type: Acquired by Synopsys
- Founded: 1996
- Headquarters: Fremont, California, USA
- Number of locations: Yerevan, Armenia; Noida, India; Warren, NJ; St. Petersburg, Russia
- Key people: Alex Shubat, The last CEO
- Products: Semiconductor IP
- Number of employees: 600 (before acquisition)

Virage Logic corporation was an American provider of both functional and physical semiconductor intellectual property (IP) for the design of complex integrated circuits. It was founded in 1996. The company's differentiated product portfolio included processor centric solutions, interface IP solutions, embedded SRAMs and NVMs, embedded memory test and repair, logic libraries, and memory development software.

== History ==
Virage Logic was founded in 1996 by Adam Kablanian and Alex Shubat. The company established operations its India and Armenia R&D operations were established in 1999. The company's initial public offering was in 2000 and a year later its STAR Memory System was introduced.

=== Acquisitions and sale ===
In 2002, the company acquired InChip, a semiconductor logic IP company. In 2007, the company acquired Ingot Systems, an ASIP company. A year later, it acquired Impinj's logic non-volatile memory IP. In 2009, the company acquired ARC International, a configurable processors and multimedia IP company, as well as NXP CMOS IP Group.

In 2010, Virage Logic was acquired by Synopsys for $315 million.

== See also ==
- ARC International
- Sonic Focus
