= Farinaz Koushanfar =

Computer scientist

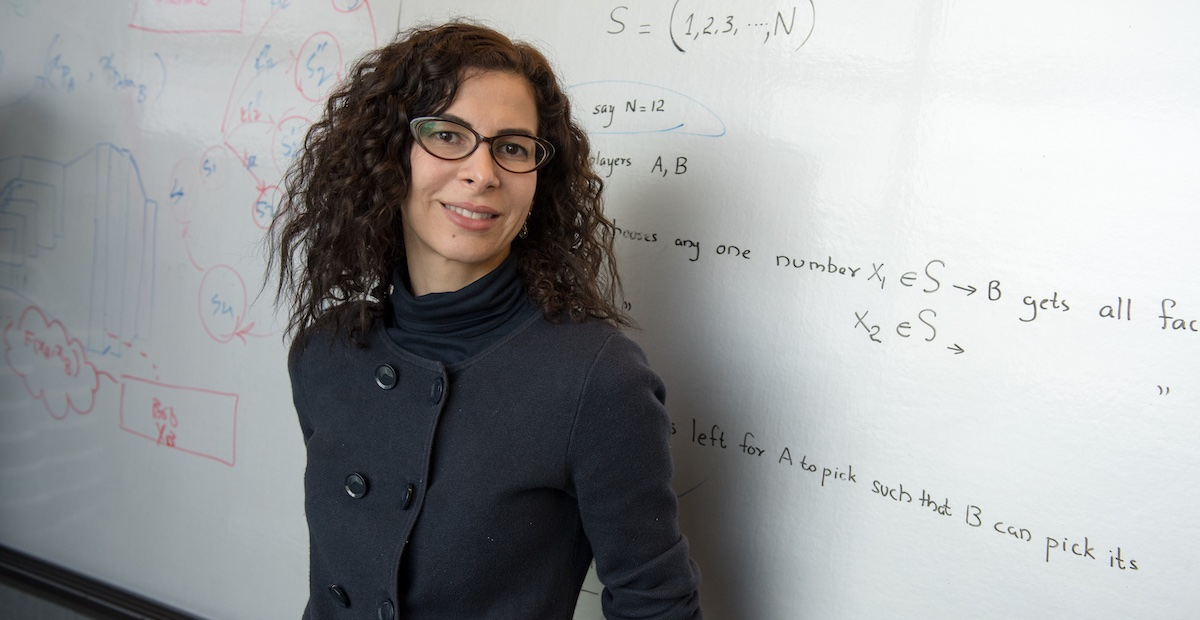
- Education: Sharif Univ. (BSEE 1998); UCLA (MS 2000); UC Berkeley (MA, PhD 2005)
- Awards: IEEE Fellow
- Scientific career
- Institutions: Univ. of Illinois (2005–2006); Rice Univ. (2006–2015); UC San Diego (2015– )
- Thesis: Ensuring data integrity in sensor-based networked systems (2005)
- Doctoral advisor: Alberto Sangiovanni-Vincentelli; Miodrag Potkonjak
- Website: farinaz.eng.ucsd.edu

Farinaz Koushanfar is an Iranian-American computer scientist whose research concerns embedded systems, ad-hoc networks, and computer security. She is a professor and Henry Booker Faculty Scholar of Electrical and Computer Engineering at the University of California, San Diego.

== Education and career ==
Koushanfar obtained her bachelor's degree in electrical engineering from Sharif University of Technology (BSEE 1998), a master's degree in electrical engineering and computer science from the University of California, Los Angeles in 2000, and a second master's degree in statistics and Ph.D. in electrical engineering and computer science from the University of California, Berkeley in 2005, with the dissertation Ensuring data integrity in sensor-based networked systems jointly supervised by Alberto Sangiovanni-Vincentelli and Miodrag Potkonjak.

After postdoctoral research at the University of Illinois Urbana-Champaign, she joined the faculty of Rice University in 2006. She moved to her present position in San Diego in 2015. At UC San Diego Jacobs School of Engineering, Koushanfar serves at the Center for Machine-Intergrated and Security (MICS) as the center's co-director.

== Recognition ==
In 2008, Koushanfar was listed in the MIT Technology Review "35 Innovators Under 35" for her work using random variation in integrated circuits as a device fingerprint allowing manufacturers to validate the authenticity of devices. Her 2008 paper "Lightweight Secure PUFs" was given the Ten Year Retrospective Most Influential Paper Award in 2017 at the International Conference on Computer Aided Design.

She was named a Presidential Early Career Award for Scientists and Engineers in 2010 and an IEEE Fellow in 2019, "for contributions to hardware and embedded systems security and to privacy-preserving computing". She was named to the 2022 class of ACM Fellows, "for contributions to secure computing and privacy-preserving machine learning". In 2024, the scientist was elected to become a National Academy of Inventors (NAI) fellow, "the highest professional distinction awarded solely to academic inventors". During the next year, in 2025, The American Association for the Advancement of Science (AAAS) selected Koushanfar as a fellow of the organization.

== Selected publications ==
- Meguerdichian, Seapahn; Koushanfar, Farinaz; Qu, Gang; Potkonjak, Miodrag (2001-07-16). "Exposure in wireless Ad-Hoc sensor networks". Proceedings of the 7th annual international conference on Mobile computing and networking. MobiCom '01. New York, NY, USA: Association for Computing Machinery. pp. 139–150. doi:10.1145/381677.381691. ISBN 978-1-58113-422-3. S2CID 1930412.
- Koushanfar, F.; Potkonjak, M.; Sangiovanni-Vincentell, A. (2002). "Fault tolerance techniques for wireless ad hoc sensor networks". Proceedings of IEEE Sensors. Vol. 2. pp. 1491–1496. doi:10.1109/ICSENS.2002.1037343. ISBN 0-7803-7454-1. S2CID 1437073.
- Majzoobi, Mehrdad; Koushanfar, Farinaz; Potkonjak, Miodrag (2008). "Lightweight secure PUFs". 2008 IEEE/ACM International Conference on Computer-Aided Design. pp. 670–673. doi:10.1109/ICCAD.2008.4681648. ISBN 978-1-4244-2819-9. S2CID 12674609.
- Tehranipoor, Mohammad; Koushanfar, Farinaz (2010). "A Survey of Hardware Trojan Taxonomy and Detection". IEEE Design & Test of Computers. 27 (1): 10–25. doi:10.1109/MDT.2010.7. ISSN 1558-1918. S2CID 206459491.
