= Alberto Sangiovanni-Vincentelli =

Italian engineer

- Born: June 23, 1947 (age 79); Milan, Italy
- Other names: Alberto Luigi Sangiovanni-Vincentelli, Alberto L. Sangiovanni-Vincentelli
- Education: Polytechnic University of Milan (MS)
- Occupations: Computer scientist, academic
- Years active: 1970s-present
- Employer: University of California, Berkeley
- Board member of: Cadence Design Systems
- Website: Profile at UC Berkeley

Alberto Luigi Sangiovanni-Vincentelli (born June 23, 1947) is an Italian-American computer scientist. Since 1976, he has been a professor affiliated with the Department of Electrical Engineering and Computer Sciences at the University of California, Berkeley. While working at UC Berkeley in the 1980s, he co-founded Cadence Design Systems and Synopsys, two EDA companies. He currently sits on the board of Cadence Design.

== Early life and education ==
Alberto Luigi Sangiovanni-Vincentelli was born on June 23, 1947 in Milan, Italy. He received his Master of Science degree in engineering at the Polytechnic University of Milan in 1971, with a specialty in electrical engineering and computer science (EECS).

== Career ==
After graduating in 1971 from the Polytechnic University of Milan, Sangiovanni Vincentelli stayed on at the university in a research post. In 1976, he moved to University of California at Berkeley, where he joined the Department of Electrical Engineering and Computer Sciences. At Berkeley, he "quickly turned his attention to the more theoretical end of electronics," designing numerical analysis algorithms for circuit design. In 1983, he co-founded Solomon Design Automation (SDA), an electronic design automation (EDA) company. Solomon Design Automation merged with ECAD in 1987 and created the company Cadence Design Systems. Also in 1987, Sangiovanni-Vincentelli co-founded the EDA company Optimal Solutions Inc, which was renamed Synopsys. By 1991, Cadence and Synopsys had increasingly started competing.

He holds the position of Edgar L. and Harold H. Buttner Chair in Berkeley's electrical engineering and computer sciences department, and since July 2019, he has served as special advisor on entrepreneurship to the Dean of Engineering at Berkeley. He has also held a number of visiting teaching positions at Italian universities.

== Awards ==
The following is a selected list of recognitions given to Alberto Sangiovanni-Vincentelli as of 2024:

- 1995: IEEE Leon K. Kirchmayer Graduate Teaching Award
- 2001: Phil Kaufman Award
- 2009: IEEE/RSE James Clerk Maxwell Medal
- 2018: ACM SIGDA Pioneering Achievement Award
- 2023: BBVA Foundation Frontiers of Knowledge Award

== Bibliography ==
Sangiovani-Vecentelli wrote or co-wrote a variety of chapters for books on VLSI (very-large-scale-integration) and related topics. He also created a presentation before a congressional subcommittee on the impact of CAD (computer-aided design) in relation to competitiveness for the U.S. economy.

Chapters to Books/Presentation
Chapter to Book or Presentations	Book/Presentations	Year
Synthesis of LSI Circuits	Synthesis System for VLSI Circuits	1987
Automatic Layout of Integrated Circuits	Synthesis System for VLSI Circuits	1987
The Impact of CAD on Competitiveness throughout the Economy	Testimony presented to the Hearings of the Subcommittee on Economic Stabilization of the Committee on Banking, Finance, and Urban Affairs of the U.S. House of Representatives	1983
