= List of largest technology companies by revenue =

This is a list of the largest global technology companies by revenue, according to the Fortune Global 500. It includes companies identified by Fortune as belonging to the technology sector, ranked by total annual revenue and net income. Only companies with annual revenues exceeding US$50 billion are included. Amazon, JD.com and Alibaba are excluded because Fortune classifies them outside the technology sector, under its retailing-related classifications.

== 2026 list ==
Company	Revenue ($B) USD	Profit ($B) USD	Country (origin)	Headquarters
Apple	$416.2	$112.0	US	Cupertino, California, US
Alphabet	$402.8	$132.2	US	Mountain View, California, US
Microsoft	$281.7	$101.8	US	Redmond, Washington, US
Foxconn	$260.1	$6.1	Taiwan	New Taipei City, Taiwan
Samsung Electronics	$234.7	$31.1	South Korea	Suwon, South Korea
Nvidia	$215.9	$120.1	US	Santa Clara, California, US
Meta	$201.0	$60.5	US	Menlo Park, California, US
Huawei	$122.6	$9.3	China	Shenzhen, China
TSMC	$122.3	$54.5	Taiwan	Hsinchu, Taiwan
Dell Technologies	$113.5	$5.9	US	Round Rock, Texas, US
Tencent	$104.6	$31.3	China	Shenzhen, China
Sony	$87.3	($2.2)	Japan	Tokyo, Japan
Lenovo	$83.1	$1.9	China	Hong Kong, China
Hitachi	$70.2	$5.3	Japan	Tokyo, Japan
Wistron	$70.2	$0.9	Taiwan	Taipei, Taiwan
Accenture	$69.7	$7.7	Ireland	Dublin, Ireland
SK Hynix	$68.3	$30.2	South Korea	Icheon, South Korea
Quanta Computer	$68.2	$2.4	Taiwan	Taoyuan, Taiwan
IBM	$67.5	$10.6	US	Armonk, New York, US
Broadcom	$63.9	$23.1	US	Palo Alto, California, US
Midea Group	$63.8	$6.1	China	Foshan, China
Xiaomi	$63.6	$5.8	China	Beijing, China
LG Electronics	$62.7	$0.7	South Korea	Seoul, South Korea
Oracle	$57.4	$12.4	US	Austin, Texas, US
Cisco	$56.7	$10.2	US	San Jose, California, US
HP	$55.3	$2.5	US	Palo Alto, California, US
Panasonic	$53.4	$1.3	Japan	Kadoma, Osaka, Japan
Intel	$52.9	($0.3)	US	Santa Clara, California, US
Uber	$52.0	$10.0	US	San Francisco, California, US

== 2025 list ==
Company	Revenue ($B) USD	Profit ($B) USD	Country (origin)	Headquarters
Apple	$391.04	$93.74	US	Cupertino, California, US
Alphabet	$350.02	$100.12	US	Mountain View, California, US
Microsoft	$245.12	$88.14	US	Redmond, Washington, US
Samsung Electronics	$220.64	$24.66	South Korea	Suwon, South Korea
Hon Hai Precision Industry	$213.70	$4.76	Taiwan	New Taipei City, Taiwan
Meta Platforms	$164.50	$62.36	US	Menlo Park, California, US
Nvidia	$130.50	$72.88	US	Santa Clara, California, US
Huawei Investment & Holding	$119.81	$8.69	China	Shenzhen, China
Dell Technologies	$95.57	$4.59	US	Round Rock, Texas, US
Tencent Holdings	$91.76	$26.97	China	Shenzhen, China
Taiwan Semiconductor Manufacturing	$90.17	$36.09	Taiwan	Hsinchu, Taiwan
Sony	$85.00	$7.49	Japan	Tokyo, Japan
Lenovo Group	$69.08	$1.38	China	Hong Kong, China (registered office); Beijing, China and Morrisville, North Carolina, US (key operations centers)
Accenture	$64.90	$7.26	Ireland/US	Dublin, Ireland/New York, US
LG Electronics	$64.33	$0.27	South Korea	Seoul, South Korea
Hitachi	$64.18	$4.04	Japan	Tokyo, Japan
International Business Machines	$62.75	$6.02	US	Armonk, New York, US
Panasonic Holdings	$55.48	$2.40	Japan	Kadoma, Osaka, Japan
Cisco Systems	$53.80	$10.32	US	San Jose, California, US
HP	$53.56	$2.78	US	Palo Alto, California, US
Intel	$53.10	($18.76)	US	Santa Clara, California, US
Oracle	$52.96	$10.47	US	Austin, Texas, US
Broadcom	$52.43	$5.90	US	Palo Alto, California, US
Xiaomi	$50.85	$3.29	China	Beijing, China

== 2024 list ==
Company	Revenue ($B) USD	Profit ($B) USD	Country (origin)	Headquarters
Apple	$383.29	$97.00	US	Cupertino, California, US
Alphabet	$307.39	$73.80	US	Mountain View, California, US
Microsoft	$211.92	$72.36	US	Redmond, Washington, US
Samsung Electronics	$198.26	$11.08	South Korea	Suwon, South Korea
Hon Hai Precision Industry	$197.88	$4.56	Taiwan	New Taipei City, Taiwan
Meta Platforms	$134.90	$39.10	US	Menlo Park, California, US
Huawei Investment & Holding	$99.47	$12.27	China	Shenzhen, China
Sony	$90.09	$6.72	Japan	Tokyo, Japan
Dell Technologies	$88.43	$3.21	US	Round Rock, Texas, US
Tencent Holdings	$86.03	$16.28	China	Shenzhen, China
Taiwan Semiconductor Manufacturing	$69.42	$27.35	Taiwan	Hsinchu, Taiwan
Hitachi	$67.31	$4.08	Japan	Tokyo, Japan
LG Electronics	$64.49	$0.55	South Korea	Seoul, South Korea
Accenture	$64.11	$6.87	Ireland	Dublin, Ireland
International Business Machines	$61.86	$7.50	US	Armonk, New York, US
Nvidia	$60.92	$29.76	US	Santa Clara, California, US
Panasonic Holdings	$58.79	$3.07	Japan	Kadoma, Osaka, Japan
Cisco Systems	$57.00	$12.61	US	San Jose, California, US
Lenovo Group	$56.86	$1.01	China	Hong Kong, China
Intel	$54.23	$1.69	US	Santa Clara, California, US
HP	$53.72	$3.26	US	Palo Alto, California, US

== 2023 list ==
Companies are ranked by total revenues for their respective fiscal years ended on or before March 31, 2023. All data in the table is taken from the Fortune Global 500 list of technology sector companies for 2023 unless otherwise specified.

Company	Revenue ($B) USD	Profit ($B) USD	Country (origin)	Headquarters
Apple	$394.33	$99.80	US	Cupertino, California, US
Alphabet	$282.84	$59.97	US	Mountain View, California, US
Samsung Electronics	$234.13	$42.40	South Korea	Suwon, South Korea
Hon Hai Precision Industry	$222.54	$4.75	Taiwan	New Taipei City, Taiwan
Microsoft	$198.27	$72.74	US	Redmond, Washington, US
Meta Platforms	$116.61	$23.20	US	Menlo Park, California, US
Dell Technologies	$102.30	$2.44	US	Round Rock, Texas, US
Huawei Investment & Holding	$95.49	$5.28	China	Shenzhen, China
Sony	$85.25	$6.92	Japan	Tokyo, Japan
Tencent Holdings	$82.44	$27.98	China	Shenzhen, China
Hitachi	$80.39	$4.80	Japan	Tokyo, Japan
Taiwan Semiconductor Manufacturing	$76.02	$33.34	Taiwan	Hsinchu, Taiwan
LG Electronics	$64.95	$0.93	South Korea	Seoul, South Korea
Intel	$63.05	$8.01	US	Santa Clara, California, US
HP	$62.98	$3.20	US	Palo Alto, California, US
Lenovo Group	$61.95	$1.61	Hong Kong/US	Hong Kong, China/Morrisville, North Carolina, US
Panasonic Holdings	$61.90	$1.96	Japan	Kadoma, Osaka, Japan
Accenture	$61.59	$6.88	Ireland/US	Dublin, Ireland/New York, US
International Business Machines	$60.53	$1.64	US	Armonk, New York, US
Cisco Systems	$51.56	$11.81	US	San Jose, California, US

== 2022 list ==
Company	Revenue ($B) USD	Profit ($B) USD	Country (origin)	Headquarters
Apple	$365.82	$94.68	US	Cupertino, California, US
Alphabet	$257.64	$76.03	US	Mountain View, California, US
Samsung Electronics	$244.33	$34.29	South Korea	Suwon, South Korea
Hon Hai Precision Industry	$214.62	$4.99	Taiwan	New Taipei City, Taiwan
Microsoft	$168.09	$61.27	US	Redmond, Washington, US
Meta Platforms	$117.93	$39.37	US	Menlo Park, California, US
Dell Technologies	$107.00	$5.56	US	Round Rock, Texas, US
Huawei Investment & Holding	$98.72	$17.62	China	Shenzhen, China
Hitachi	$91.37	$5.19	Japan	Tokyo, Japan
Sony	$88.32	$7.85	Japan	Tokyo, Japan
Tencent Holdings	$86.84	$34.85	China	Shenzhen, China
Intel	$79.02	$19.87	US	Santa Clara, California, US
International Business Machines	$72.34	$5.74	US	Armonk, New York, US
Lenovo Group	$71.62	$2.03	Hong Kong/US	Hong Kong, China/Morrisville, North Carolina, US
LG Electronics	$66.86	$0.90	South Korea	Seoul, South Korea
Panasonic Holdings	$65.77	$2.27	Japan	Kadoma, Osaka, Japan
HP	$63.49	$6.50	US	Palo Alto, California, US
Taiwan Semiconductor Manufacturing	$56.84	$21.21	Taiwan	Hsinchu, Taiwan
Xiaomi	$50.90	$3.00	China	Beijing, China
Accenture	$50.53	$5.91	Ireland/US	Dublin, Ireland/New York, US

== 2021 list ==
Companies are ranked by total revenues for their respective fiscal years ended on or before March 31, 2021. All data in the table is taken from the Fortune Global 500 list of technology sector companies for 2021 unless otherwise specified. As of 2021, Fortune lists Amazon (revenue of $386.064 billion), Jingdong ($108.087 billion), and Alibaba ($105.865 billion) in the retailing sector rather than the technology sector.

Rank	Company		Revenue ($B) USD	Employees	Revenue per employee ($K USD)	Country (origin)	Headquarters
1	(United States)	Apple	$383.93	147,000	1867.44897	US	Cupertino, California, US
2	(South Korea)	Samsung Electronics	$200.734	267,937	749.18357	South Korea	Suwon, South Korea
3	(United States)	Alphabet	$182.527	135,301	1349.04398	US	Mountain View, California, US
4	(Taiwan)	Foxconn	$181.945	878,429	207.12544	Taiwan	New Taipei City, Taiwan
5	(United States)	Microsoft	$143.015	163,000	877.39263	US	Redmond, Washington, US
6	(China)	Huawei	$129.184	197,000	655.75634	China	Shenzhen, China
7	(United States)	Dell Technologies	$92.224	158,000	583.6962	US	Round Rock, Texas, US
8	(United States)	Meta	$85.965	58,604	1466.87939	US	Menlo Park, California, US
9	(Japan)	Sony	$84.893	109,700	773.86508	Japan	Tokyo, Japan
10	(Japan)	Hitachi	$82.345	350,864	234.69207	Japan	Tokyo, Japan
11	(United States)	Intel	$77.867	110,600	704.04159	US	Santa Clara, California, US
12	(United States)	IBM	$73.620	364,800	201.80921	US	Armonk, New York, US
13	(China)	Tencent	$69.864	85,858	813.71567	China	Shenzhen, China
14	(Japan)	Panasonic	$63.191	243,540	259.46867	Japan	Osaka, Japan
15	(China)	Lenovo	$60.742	71,500	849.53846	China	Hong Kong, China
16	(United States)	HP Inc.	$56.639	53,000	1068.66037	US	Palo Alto, California, US
17	(South Korea)	LG Electronics	$53.625	75,000	715.00000	South Korea	Seoul, South Korea

== 2020 list ==
Companies are ranked by total revenues for their respective fiscal years ended on or before March 31, 2020. All data in the table is taken from the Fortune Global 500 list of technology sector companies for 2020 unless otherwise specified. As of 2020, Fortune lists Amazon (revenue of $280.522 billion) in the retailing sector rather than the technology sector.

Rank	Company		Revenue ($B) USD	Employees	Revenue per employee ($K USD)	Headquarters
1	(United States)	Apple	$260.174	137,000	1899.08029	Cupertino, California, US
2	(South Korea)	Samsung Electronics	$197.705	287,439	687.8155	Suwon, South Korea
3	(Taiwan)	Foxconn	$178.869	757,404	236.16062	New Taipei City, Taiwan
4	(United States)	Alphabet	$161.857	118,899	1361.29824	Mountain View, California, US
5	(United States)	Microsoft	$125.843	144,000	873.90972	Redmond, Washington, US
6	(China)	Huawei	$124.316	194,000	640.80412	Shenzhen, China
7	(United States)	Dell Technologies	$92.154	165,000	558.50909	Round Rock, Texas, US
8	(Japan)	Hitachi	$80.639	301,056	267.85382	Tokyo, Japan
9	(United States)	IBM	$77.147	383,056	201.39875	Armonk, New York, US
10	(Japan)	Sony	$75.972	111,700	680.14324	Tokyo, Japan
11	(United States)	Intel	$71.965	110,800	649.50361	Santa Clara, California, US
12	(United States)	Meta(Facebook)	$70.697	44,942	1573.07195	Menlo Park, California, US
13	(Japan)	Panasonic	$68.897	259,385	265.61674	Osaka, Japan
14	(United States)	HP Inc.	$58.756	56,000	1049.21428	Palo Alto, California, US
15	(China)	Tencent	$54.613	62,885	868.45829	Shenzhen, China
16	(South Korea)	LG Electronics	$53.464	74,000	722.48648	Seoul, South Korea
17	(United States)	Cisco	$51.904	75,900	683.84716	San Jose, California, US
18	(China)	Lenovo	$50.716	63,000	805.01587	Hong Kong, China

== 2019 list ==
Companies are ranked by total revenues for their respective fiscal years ended on or before March 31, 2019. All data in the table is taken from the Fortune Global 500 list of technology sector companies for 2019 unless otherwise specified. As of 2019, Fortune lists Amazon (revenue of $232.887 billion) in the retailing sector rather than the technology sector.

	Rank	Company	Revenue ($B) USD	Employees	Revenue per employee ($K USD)	Headquarters
1	(United States)	Apple	$265.595	132,000	$2012.08333	Cupertino, California, US
2	(South Korea)	Samsung Electronics	$197.700	309,630	$638.50402	Suwon, South Korea
3	(Taiwan)	Foxconn	$175.617	667,680	$263.0257	New Taipei City, Taiwan
4	(United States)	Alphabet	$136.819	98,771	$1385.21428	Mountain View, California, US
5	(United States)	Microsoft	$110.360	131,000	$842.44274	Redmond, Washington, US
6	(China)	Huawei	$109.030	188,000	$579.9468	Shenzhen, China
7	(United States)	Dell Technologies	$90.621	157,000	$577.20382	Round Rock, Texas, US
8	(Japan)	Hitachi	$85.507	295,941	$288.93259	Tokyo, Japan
9	(United States)	IBM	$79.591	381,100	$208.84544	Armonk, New York, US
10	(Japan)	Sony	$78.157	114,400	$683.19055	Tokyo, Japan
11	(Japan)	Panasonic	$72.178	271,869	$265.48815	Osaka, Japan
12	(United States)	Intel	$70.848	107,400	$659.6648	Santa Clara, California, US
13	(United States)	HP Inc.	$58.472	55,000	$1063.12727	Palo Alto, California, US
14	(United States)	Meta(Facebook)	$55.838	35,587	$1569.05611	Menlo Park, California, US
15	(South Korea)	LG Electronics	$55.757	72,600	$768.00275	Seoul, South Korea
16	(China)	Lenovo	$51.037	57,000	$895.38596	Hong Kong, China

== 2018 list ==
Ranked by total revenues for respective fiscal years ended on or before March 31, 2018.

	Rank	Company	Fiscal year ending	Revenue ($B) USD	Employees	Revenue per employee ($K USD)	Headquarters
1	(United States)	Apple Inc.	September 30, 2017	$229.2	123,000	$1863.41463	Cupertino, California, US
2	(South Korea)	Samsung Electronics	December 31, 2017	$211.9	320,670	$660.80394	Suwon, South Korea
3	(United States)	Amazon	December 31, 2017	$177.9	613,300	$290.07011	Seattle, Washington, US
4	(Taiwan)	Foxconn	December 31, 2017	$154.7–158	803,126	$192.62232	New Taipei City, Taiwan
5	(United States)	Alphabet Inc.	December 31, 2017	$110.8	80,110	$1383.09823	Mountain View, California, US
6	(United States)	Microsoft	June 30, 2017	$90.0	124,000	$725.80645	Redmond, Washington, US
7	(China)	Huawei	December 31, 2017	$89.3–92.5	180,000	$496.11111	Shenzhen, China
8	(Japan)	Hitachi	March 31, 2018	$84.6	307,275	$275.3234	Tokyo, Japan
9	(United States)	IBM	December 31, 2017	$79.1	397,800	$198.84364	Armonk, New York, US
10	(United States)	Dell Technologies	January 31, 2018	$78.7	145,000	$542.75862	Round Rock, Texas, US
11	(Japan)	Sony	March 31, 2018	$77.1	117,300	$657.289	Tokyo, Japan
12	(Japan)	Panasonic	March 31, 2018	$72.0	274,143	$262.63665	Osaka, Japan
13	(United States)	Intel	December 31, 2017	$62.8	102,700	$611.48977	Santa Clara, California, US
14	(South Korea)	LG Electronics	December 31, 2017	$54.3	74,000	$733.78378	Seoul, South Korea
15	(China)	JD.com	December 31, 2017	$54.0	157,831	$342.1381	Beijing, China
16	(United States)	HP Inc.	October 31, 2017	$52.0	49,000	$1061.22448	Palo Alto, California, US

== See also ==
- List of largest Internet companies
- List of the largest software companies
- List of largest manufacturing companies by revenue
- List of largest companies by revenue
- List of largest United States–based employers globally
- List of largest employers
