= SCALD =

The structured computer-aided logic design (SCALD) software was a computer aided design system developed for building the S-1 computer. It used the Stanford University Drawing System (SUDS), and it was developed by Thomas M. McWilliams and Lawrence Curtis Widdoes, Jr. The work led to the start of the Valid Logic Systems company (briefly known as SCALD Corporation) in 1981, which was purchased by Cadence Design in 1991.

McWilliams and Widdoes won the W. Wallace McDowell Award in 1984 for the SCALD methodology.

== See also ==
- Static timing analysis
