= Antarctic Wildlife Research Fund =

The Antarctic Wildlife Research Fund (AWR) is a non-governmental organization that funds research into the ecology of Antarctica. It was founded in 2015 by a coalition that included the King of Norway and krill fishing company Aker BioMarine, with the intention of researching krill conservation.

The organization has funded research into topics including Humpback whale migration patterns and penguin feeding behaviors.
