= AWR Corporation =

AWR Corporation is an electronic design automation (EDA) software company, formerly known as Applied Wave Research, and then acquired by National Instruments

The company develops, markets, sells and supports engineering software, which provides a computer-based environment for the design of hardware for wireless and high speed digital products. AWR software is used for radio frequency (RF), microwave and high frequency analog circuit and system design. Typical applications include cellular and satellite communications systems and defense electronics including radar, electronic warfare and guidance systems.

AWR's product portfolio includes Microwave Office, Visual System Simulator (VSS), Analog Office, APLAC, AXIEM and Analyst. AWR's customers include companies involved in the design and development of analog and mixed signal semiconductors, wireless communications equipment, aerospace and defense systems.

== History ==
The company was founded in 1994 by Joseph E. Pekarek, Ted A. Miracco, Stephen A. Maas and Paul Cameron, from Hughes Aircraft, in Fullerton, California. First established as Applied Wave Research, AWR was founded to improve the design efficiency for radio frequency and microwave circuit and system design. The vision of the company was to provide a modern object-oriented electronic design automation environment that could streamline high frequency electronic design by integrating schematic entry and layout; electromagnetic (EM) and circuit theory; and frequency and time-domain methods.

Investors in AWR included CMEA Ventures, Intel Capital and Synopsys Inc. In 1998 the company demonstrated the Microwave Office software, which included EM, circuit simulation and schematic capture, at the International Microwave Symposium in Baltimore, Maryland.

In 2010, AWR Corporation's major competitors included the EEsof EDA division of Agilent Technologies, Ansoft Corporation, and Cadence Design Systems.

In 1999, AWR acquired ICUCOM Corporation, Troy, New York. Through this acquisition AWR acquired the communication systems simulation software called ACOLADE, for Advanced Communication Link Analysis and Design Environment. AWR re-engineered the software and evolved the technology and libraries into a new tool: Visual System Simulator (VSS), which was introduced in 2002.

In September 2005, AWR acquired APLAC Solutions, Oy, of Espoo, Finland. AWR acquired APLAC, which developed simulation and analysis software for analog and radio-frequency (RF) design. APLAC's RF design technology was used in mobile phone RF integrated circuits.

In 2008, AWR acquired Simulation Technology and Applied Research (STAAR), in Mequon, Wisconsin. STAAR developed proprietary parallelized 3D FEM EM simulation and analysis capability, marketed as Analyst software.

AWR was acquired by National Instruments in 2011 for about $58 million.

In January 2020, Cadence Design Systems completed acquisition of AWR Corporation from National Instruments.
