= ECAD, Inc. =

Defunct American software company

ECAD, Inc., based in Santa Clara, California, was an early vendor of electronic design automation software. The company was best known for its design rule checking product Dracula, but also produced IC layout and PC layout software. Eventually, in a merger with SDA, it became Cadence Design Systems.

== ECAD history ==
ECAD was founded in August 1982 by Paul Huang, Ping Chao, and Glen M. Antle, who had worked at Texas Instruments, ITT, Teledyne, Data General, and (just before founding ECAD), the microelectronics products division of Systems Engineering Laboratories (SEL) in Sunnyvale, California. While developing a new computer design at SEL, the CAD group wrote a new (and very fast) algorithm for Design rule checking (DRC). These ideas eventually became the basis of ECAD's products.

In 1982, SEL was acquired by Gould Inc., and part of the CAD group spun out as ECAD.

ECAD's first product was Dracula, introduced in April 1983. It included a design-rule checker, an electrical rule checker, and a layout-versus-schematic consistency checker among other programs. This was followed by SYMBAD, an IC layout product suite.

ECAD sold only software, an unusual business tactic at this time. However, it was consistently profitable. In 1987, it went public on NASDAQ, and in 1988 in a merger with SDA Systems, it became Cadence Design Systems.
