= James Solomon (engineer) =

American engineer and entrepreneur (born 1936)

- Born: James E. Solomon; 1936 (age 89–90); Boise, Idaho, U.S.
- Education: University of California, Berkeley (BSE, ME)
- Occupations: Entrepreneur, engineer

James E. Solomon (born 1936) is an American engineer and entrepreneur. He has founded four companies, including one of the companies that merged to form the leading chip manufacturing toolmaker Cadence Design Systems. He is an IEEE Fellow and received the industry's Phil Kaufman Award in 1997. Solomon holds 23 patents in integrated chip design.

== Biography ==
Solomon graduated with BS and MS degrees in electrical engineering from the University of California, Berkeley.

He began his career with Maconomy, spending three years designing radar devices and components for missile control systems. The next seven years, he ran linear integrated circuit design at the Motorola Semiconductor Lab. After his time with Motorola, he moved to National Semiconductor from 1970–1983, where he was director of IC design for analog and mixed-signal chips.

In 1983 Solomon founded his first company, Solomon Design Automation (SDA Systems), which eventually merged with ECAD to become Cadence Design Systems . Near the end of his time with CDS, he co-founded Smart Machines (in 1994), a company that manufactures direct-drive robots for semiconductor wafer manufacture. The company was acquired in 1999 by Brooks Automation. In 1995, he co-founded Xulu Entertainment, a computer based entertainment venture. In 2001, Solomon unveiled plans for a 20,000-square-foot (1,900 m^{2}) entertainment center to be named Xulu Universe , which would combine a restaurant/lounge with a simulator of an alien world. According to Solomon, Xulu had invested over $12 million in the project, having hired design and engineering staff from companies such as Lucasfilm and Disney.

Solomon was the 1997 recipient of the Phil Kaufman Award "for his innovative contributions to design tool technology of benefit to electronic systems and IC designers".
