= Fortify Software =

American software company

Fortify
- Type: Software Vendor
- Industry: Computer software
- Genre: Software Security Assurance
- Founded: 2003
- Founder: Ted Schlein of Kleiner, Perkins, Caufield & Byers, Mike Armistead, Brian Chess, Arthur Do, Roger Thornton
- Headquarters: San Mateo, California, United States
- Key people: John M. Jack (former CEO), Jacob West (head of Security Research Group), Brian Chess (former Chief Scientist), Arthur Do (former Chief Architect)
- Owner: OpenText
- Website: OpenText; OpenText Cybersecurity Cloud

Fortify Software, later known as Fortify Inc., is a California-based software security vendor, founded in 2003 and acquired by Hewlett-Packard in 2010, Micro Focus in 2017, and OpenText in 2023.

Fortify offerings included static application security testing and dynamic application security testing products, as well as products and services that support software security assurance. In 2011, Fortify introduced Fortify OnDemand, a static and dynamic application testing service.

== History ==
Fortify Software was founded by Kleiner Perkins in 2003. Fortify Inc. was acquired by HP in 2010.

On September 7, 2016, HPE CEO Meg Whitman announced that the software assets of Hewlett Packard Enterprise, including Fortify, would be merged with Micro Focus to create an independent company of which HP Enterprise shareholders would retain majority ownership.

Micro Focus CEO Kevin Loosemore called the transaction "entirely consistent with our established acquisition strategy and our focus on efficient management of mature infrastructure products" and indicated that Micro Focus intended to "bring the core earnings margin for the mature assets in the deal - about 80 percent of the total - from 21 percent today to Micro Focus's existing 46 percent level within three years."

OpenText acquired Micro Focus (including Fortify Software products) in 2023.

== Security research ==
Fortify created a security research group that maintained the Java Open Review project and the Vulncat taxonomy of security vulnerabilities in addition to the security rules for Fortify's analysis software. Members of the group wrote the book Secure Coding with Static Analysis, and published research, including JavaScript Hijacking, Attacking the build: Cross build Injection, Watch what you write: Preventing Cross-site scripting by observing program output, and Dynamic taint propagation: Finding vulnerabilities without attacking.

== See also ==
- List of tools for static code analysis
