= Synopsys =

American software company

Synopsys, Inc.

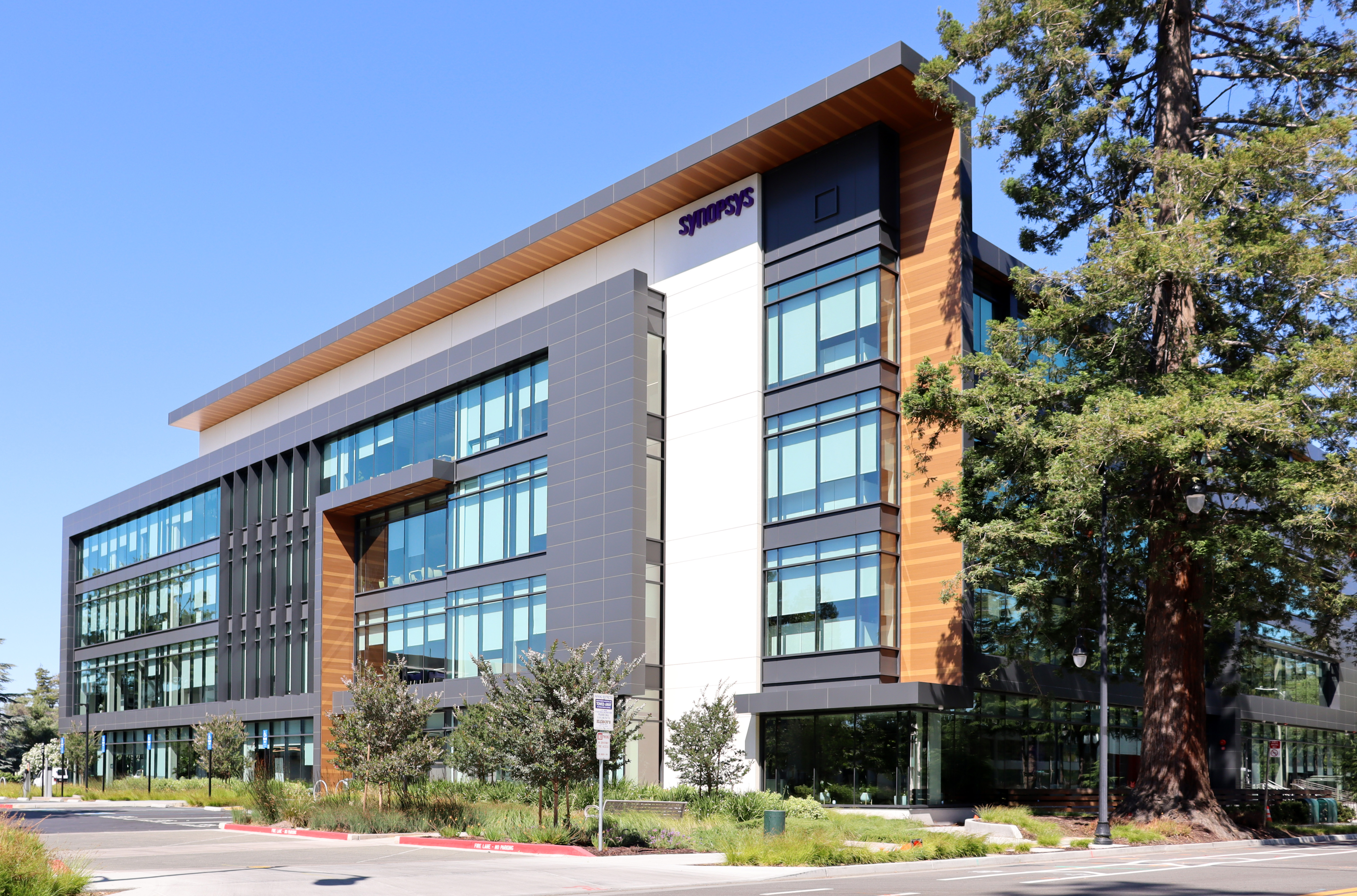
- Headquarters in Sunnyvale, California
- Type: Public
- Traded as: Nasdaq: SNPS; Nasdaq-100 component; S&P 500 component
- Industry: Integrated circuit; Software as a service; Software testing; Internet of Things
- Founded: 1986; 40 years ago, in Research Triangle Park, North Carolina, U.S.
- Founders: Aart de Geus; David Gregory; Bill Krieger; Alberto Sangiovanni-Vincentelli
- Headquarters: Sunnyvale, California, U.S.
- Key people: Aart de Geus (chairman); Sassine Ghazi (president & CEO)
- Revenue: ▲US$7.05 billion (2025)
- Operating income: ▼US$915 million (2025)
- Net income: ▼US$1.33 billion (2025)
- Total assets: ▲US$48.2 billion (2025)
- Total equity: ▲US$28.3 billion (2025)
- Number of employees: c. 25,000 (2026)
- Divisions: Silicon Design & Verification, Silicon Intellectual Property, Software Integrity Group
- Website: synopsys.com
- Footnotes; Financials as of October 31, 2025.

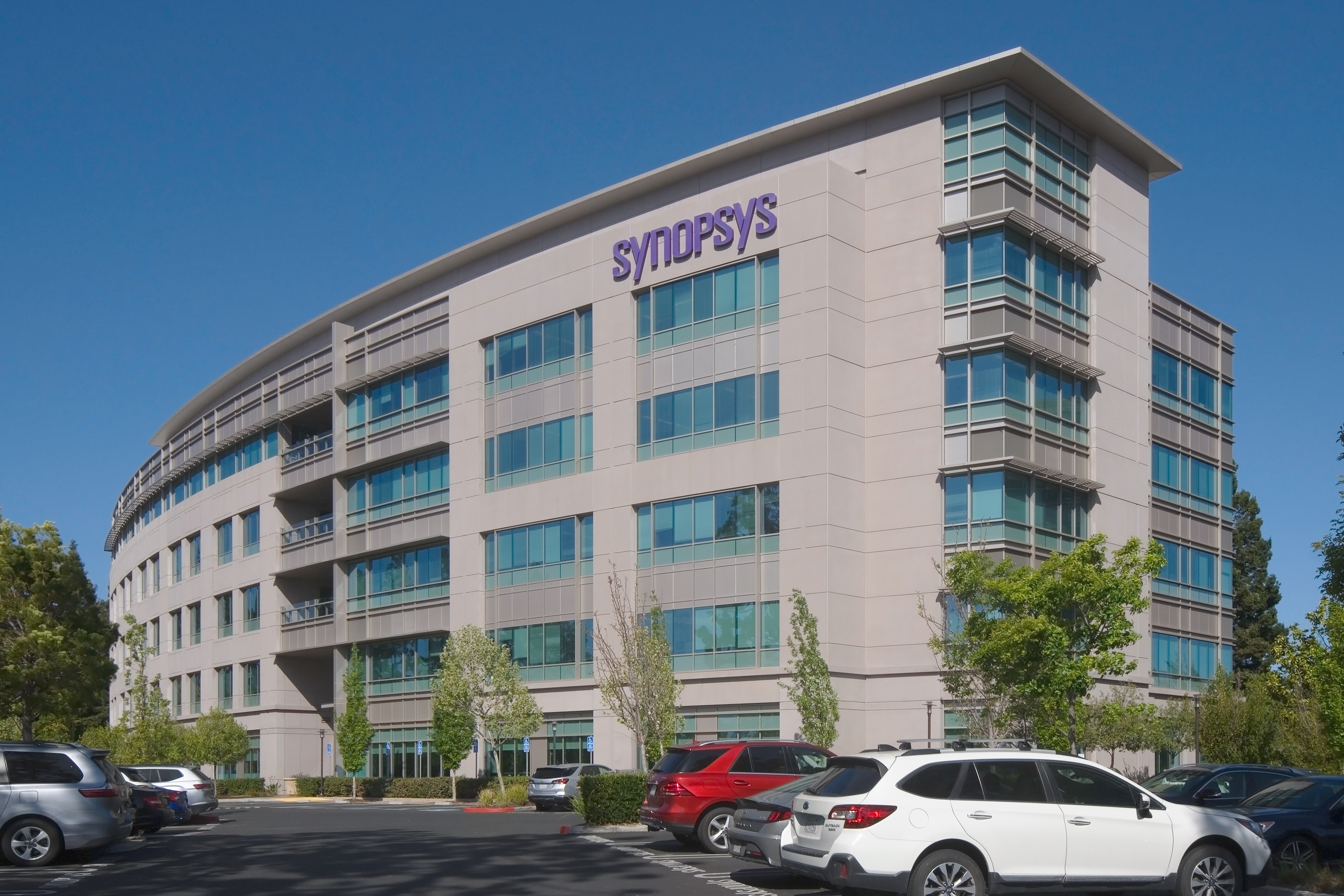
Former headquarters in Mountain View, California

Synopsys, Inc. is an American multinational electronic design automation (EDA) company headquartered in Sunnyvale, California, that focuses on design and verification of silicon chips, electronic system-level design and verification, and reusable components (intellectual property). Synopsys supplies tools and services to the semiconductor design and manufacturing industry. Products include tools for implementation of digital and analog circuits, simulators, and debugging environments that assist in the design of chips and computer systems. In 2024, Synopsys was listed as the 12th largest software company in the world.

== History ==
Synopsys was founded by Aart de Geus, David Gregory, Alberto Sangiovanni-Vincentelli and Bill Krieger in 1986 in Research Triangle Park, North Carolina. The company was initially established as Optimal Solutions with a charter to develop and market logic synthesis technology developed by the team at General Electric's Advanced Computer-Aided Engineering Group. The company changed its name to Synopsys and moved to Mountain View, California in 1987. It became a public company through an initial public offering in February 1992, opening on NASDAQ at $7.13 a share and closing on the first trading day at $7.88. 2 million shares were offered; the company offered 1.55 million shares and stockholders offered 450,000 shares.

In 2006, the company built a supercomputer for EDA applications using commodity Linux servers and off-the-shelf hardware that was listed on the TOP500 as the 242nd most powerful computer, based on results on the LINPACK benchmark.

Synopsys has been a constituent of the Nasdaq-100 and S&P 500 indices since 2017.

Synopsys engineers began developing reinforcement learning applications for electronic design automation in 2017, which led to the introduction of the DSO.ai (design-space optimization) product for digital chip implementation in 2020, followed by a series of AI tools for IC verification and test, as well as other applications. In 2023, Synopsys announced the Copilot product in collaboration with Microsoft that leveraged large language models from OpenAI to assist in chip design. (For more information, see #Adoption of AI technologies.)

In August 2023, Synopsys named COO Sassine Ghazi as CEO. Ghazi succeeded Aart de Geus in January 2024, with de Geus transitioning to the role of executive chairman.

On July 17, 2025, Synopsys completed its acquisition of Ansys, a global provider of engineering simulation software. The transaction, first announced on January 16, 2024, was valued at approximately $35 billion, making it the largest acquisition in Synopsys’ history. Several media outlets described the deal as one of the largest transactions in the engineering and software industry. The merger combines Synopsys’ EDA dominance with Ansys’ multiphysics simulation expertise, promising a new era of co-optimized chip and system design In November 2025, it was reported that Synopsys planned to lay off about 10% of its workforce and close certain locations as part of a restructure following the acquisition of Ansys. The layoffs will largely take place during fiscal year 2026.

== Markets and competition ==
Synopsys faces significant competition in the electronic design automation market, primarily from Cadence Design Systems and Siemens EDA (formerly Mentor Graphics), with the three companies collectively dominating approximately 75% of the global EDA market as of 2024. Additionally, Synopsys is the second largest semiconductor design intellectual property (IP) company by revenue (after ARM Holdings) and leads in market share for IP license revenues, notably providing reusable chip design modules such as those supporting Ethernet and UALink for advanced data center connectivity and AI accelerator infrastructure.

== Geographic presence ==
Headquartered in Sunnyvale, California, Synopsys maintains extensive office locations worldwide, including a strong presence across North America, Asia, and Europe. The company has approximately 23% of its employees in the United States. As of 2026, Synopsys’ permanent workforce numbers approximately 25000 worldwide, with thousands of employees distributed across additional offices and remote locations, including significant operations in India, Canada, China, Mexico, Armenia, Portugal, France, Germany, Singapore, and other countries. Its international offices can be found in cities such as Ottawa, Toronto, and Vancouver (Canada); Yerevan and Gyumri (Armenia); Bangalore, Hyderabad, and Noida (India); Penang (Malaysia); and Singapore, among others. In Europe, France is a major European presence, there are several offices, with the major ones being located in Lyon, Paris, Grenoble and Nice. Synopsys also maintains a significant engineering and development presence in Portugal, employing more than 600 people across two main technical hubs. The company operates offices in Lisbon (located in the Lagoas Park business complex in Porto Salvo) and Porto (situated within the Tecmaia technological park in Moreira da Maia). These locations function primarily as core microelectronics design centers, focusing on analog design, integrated circuit and digital verification, hardware prototyping, and firmware development. In Canada, the company has offices in Markham, Nepean, Ottawa and Vancouver. It is also one of the largest employers for engineers in Armenia, with offices in Yerevan and Gyumri. The company has substantial presence in Asia, with multiple offices in India, some of the major ones located in the cities of Bangalore, Noida, Pune and Hyderabad. China on the other hand has office locations in Shanghai, Beijing, Nanjing, and Shenzhen, while in Japan and South Korea, the company operates primarily out of Tokyo and Osaka for Japan, and Seoul for South Korea.

Synopsys operates on a global scale, with its business spread across several major regions and markets. The United States is the company's largest market, contributing 44.71% of total revenue in fiscal year 2024 (approximately $2.74 billion). Other significant markets include China, which represented 16.15% of revenue ($989.52 million); Korea, accounting for 12.62% ($773.02 million); and Europe, with 10.03% ($614.58 million). The company also recorded 16.49% of its revenue ($1.01 billion) under the "Other Countries" category, highlighting a diversified international footprint, which includes India contributing $250 million in revenue.

=== Business in the United States ===
In 2020, the United States Department of Defense announced Synopsys as a partner in U.S. Defense Advanced Research Projects Agency (DARPA) Automatic Implementation of Secure Silicon (AISS) research program along with ARM, Boeing, IBM, and other entities focused on developing automated design tools for secure chips. In October 2022, Synopsys joined Intel's US Military Aerospace and Government Alliance (USMAG), under which Synopsys supplies secure EDA tools, IP, and design services for the US DoD and other government branches along with other chip design companies including Cadence and Siemens EDA. In 2025, DARPA announced companies that have been selected for the initial stage of the government's Quantum Benchmarking Initiatives (QBI), in which Synopsys is participating along with Hewlett Packard, Applied Materials, University of Wisconsin and other organizations to advance quantum computing research and development. The company contributes its expertise in modeling and simulation, EDA tools and semiconductor IP, as part of this multi-partner effort to determine whether an industrially useful quantum computer can be built more rapidly than conventional projections suggest.

=== Business in China ===
In 2017, the company established a $100 million strategic investment fund for the Chinese market.

In April 2021, following a Washington Post report on the use of Synopsys and Cadence Design Systems technology in the People's Liberation Army's military-civil fusion efforts, U.S. legislators Michael McCaul and Tom Cotton requested that the United States Department of Commerce tighten controls on the sales of semiconductor manufacturing software. In 2022, Bloomberg reported that Synopsys was under investigation by the United States Department of Commerce for unlawful technology transfers to sanctioned companies in China such as Huawei's HiSilicon and Semiconductor Manufacturing International Corporation.

In May 2025, the Trump administration briefly paused the issuing of licenses for exports of airplane and semiconductor technology to China, which impacted Synopsys and other American Electronic Design Automation vendors.

(For more information, see #Export control restrictions.)

=== Offices in Armenia ===
Synopsys Armenia is one of the largest Synopsys sites outside the United States, employing more than 1,000 people across two offices in Yerevan and one in Gyumri, making it one of the largest IT employers in the country. The Armenian offices serve as a research and development hub, providing support for electronic design automation (EDA), design for manufacturing (DFM), and semiconductor intellectual property (IP) solutions. Synopsys Armenia's teams work on advanced logic and analog integrated circuit design, software development, and verification, contributing both to global product support and innovation. In addition to technical work, Synopsys Armenia invests heavily in workforce development and professional education, collaborating with local universities to train highly skilled specialists in microelectronics and related fields.

== Adoption of AI technologies ==
In March 2020, Synopsys introduced DSO.ai (Design Space Optimization AI), a cloud-based AI-based software tool for chip design, The software uses AI (reinforcement learning) to automate logic synthesis as well as place and route decisions for circuit blocks.

In March 2023, Synopsys expanded its artificial intelligence applications by introducing VSO.ai (Verification Space Optimization) and TSO.ai (Test Space Optimization) as part of the Synopsys.ai suite. VSO.ai uses machine learning to accelerate verification coverage closure and identify functional coverage gaps, while TSO.ai applies reinforcement learning to optimize test pattern generation.

In November 2023, Synopsys launched Synopsys.ai Copilot through a collaboration with Microsoft, integrating Azure OpenAI service to provide generative AI capabilities for semiconductor design via the use of large language models.

In 2026, Synopsys introduced an agentic AI technology called AgentEngineer for chip design tasks. The company says the technology is meant to automate engineering work across the chip design process, from implementation through verification and debugging. In March 2026, Synopsys announced multiphysics fusion technology, the first EDA software resulting from the company's Ansys acquisition. As of June 2026, customers of multiphysics fusion include Nvidia, MediaTek, and Cisco.

== Mergers and acquisitions ==
Synopsys has grown significantly by acquiring companies in electronic design automation and related fields.

=== Virtio Corporation ===
Virtio Corporation was founded in 1999 and based in Campbell, California, USA with development centers in Campbell and Livingston, Scotland, UK. Virtio Corporation was a pioneering creator of Virtual SoC Platforms for early embedded software development. Virtio Corporation was acquired by Synopsys in May 2006.

=== CoWare ===
CoWare development was initiated by the Interuniversity Microelectronics Centre in Belgium as an internal project in 1992; it spun off as an independent company, supplying platform-driven electronic system-level (ESL) design software and services, four years later. CoWare was acquired by Synopsys in February 2010.

=== Code Dx ===
Code Dx was an American software technology company active from 2015 to 2021. The company's self-titled flagship product is a vulnerability management system that combines and correlates the results generated by a wide variety of static and dynamic testing tools. It was acquired by Synopsys in 2021.

=== Avanti Corporation ===
Avanti Corporation (styled as "Avant!") was founded when several former Cadence Design Systems employees bought the startup ArcSys, which had previously merged with Integrated Silicon Solutions (ISS), gaining Avanti its design rule checking and layout versus schematic tool Hercules (including 3D silicon structure modeling). Avanti then bought Compass Design Automation, which had fully integrated IC design flow and ASIC libraries, especially its place and route tool, which Avanti reworked to create Saturn and Apollo II. Avanti also bought TMA (Technology Modeling Associates), which brought its pioneering TCAD and Proteus optical proximity correction tools. The acquisition of Avanti was Synopsys' most significant and controversial acquisition. At the time, Avanti was the No. 4 company in the EDA industry, and was struggling with a major lawsuit from Cadence for software theft. Avanti was merged into Synopsys on June 6, 2002, during the litigation. Synopsys paid Cadence about $265 million to end that litigation. Soon after the settlement, the California Supreme Court upheld the lower court's earlier decision. Synopsys then paid $26.1 million to Silvaco to settle two of Silvaco's three lawsuits against Meta-Software, earlier purchased by Avanti, and its president. The lawsuits were filed in 1995 and inherited by Avanti.

=== Optical Research Associates ===
Synopsys acquired Optical Research Associates (ORA) in 2010, including its software products CODE V and LightTools.

=== Magma Design Automation ===
Synopsys agreed to buy its competitor Magma Design Automation for $507 million in an all-cash deal in November 2011.

The two companies previously faced drawn-out, back-and-forth patent disputes, which began in 2004. These disputes arose when Synopsys claimed one of Magma's co-founders, Lukas van Ginneken, developed technology for Magma products that was based on work he conducted while employed at Synopsys. While van Ginneken later acknowledged the claim, Magma and Synopsys continued disputing each other's patents. The litigations were eventually settled in 2007, with Magma paying Synopsys $12.5 million, and the companies agreeing to cross-license the disputed patents to each other.

=== Ciranova ===
Ciranova was an EDA company which focused on analog design automation. The company authored the Python-based PyCell software now central to IPL Alliance iPDK parameterized cells (used by many foundries such as TSMC), and also developed an automatic analog layout tools called Helix. Ciranova was acquired by Synopsys in 2012.

=== Novas Software ===
Novas Software was a company founded in 1996 to address debugging of chip designs. Novas was purchased by Taiwan-based EDA company SpringSoft in May 2008. SpringSoft and Novas were acquired by Synopsys in 2012.

=== Numerical Technologies ===
Numerical Technologies, Inc. was a San Jose-based electronic design automation public (NASDAQ: NMTC) company. The company was primarily known for its intellectual property, software tools and services covering phase-shifting mask technology. On March 3, 2003, it was acquired by Synopsys for $250 million.

=== SpringSoft ===
SpringSoft is a software company that developed VLSI design and debugging software. The company was founded with a grant from the Taiwanese National Science Council in February 1996.

In 1997, SpringSoft established Novas Software in Silicon Valley to market Springsoft's VLSI Debugging software. SpringSoft created a custom layout tool called Laker and a US-based company called Silicon Canvas. In May 2008, SpringSoft purchased Novas Software Silicon Canvas and combined them to form the wholly owned subsidiary SpringSoft USA. SpringSoft employed over 400 people with office locations across the world.

Synopsys announced its acquisition of SpringSoft in 2012.

=== Synplicity ===
Synplicity Inc. was a supplier of software for the design of programmable logic devices (FPGAs, PLDs, and CPLDs) used for communications, military/aerospace, consumer, semiconductor, computer and other electronic systems. Synplicity's tools provided logic synthesis, physical synthesis, and verification functions for FPGA, FPGA-based ASIC prototyping, and DSP designers. Synplicity was listed on Nasdaq until it was acquired by Synopsys for $227 million in a transaction finalized on May 15, 2008.

=== ARC International ===
ARC International PLC was the designer of ARC (Argonaut RISC Core) embedded processors, which were widely used in SoC devices for IoT, storage, digital home, mobile, and automotive applications. Virage Logic, which acquired ARC International in 2009, was sold to Synopsys in 2010.

In January 2026, it was announced that Synopsys was selling its processor IP product lines, including the ARC and ARC-V CPU IP, to GlobalFoundries.

=== MOSAID Semiconductor IP ===
Synopsys announced the acquisition of MOSAID's Semiconductor IP business for $15M in July 2007. Assets included double-data-rate (DDR) memory controllers and PHY semiconductor IP products.

=== Coverity ===
In February 2014, Synopsys agreed to acquire static code analysis vendor Coverity for $375 million. Synopsys relied on Coverity's products for around ten years prior to the acquisition, helping improve software security by finding and fixing defects in software code before its release.

Coverity's open-source Coverity Scan tool was hacked and used for cryptocurrency mining in February 2018. Synopsys took down the service for four weeks and confirmed the incident did not affect any of its corporate network and found no evidence of data abuse of its open-source users.

=== Codenomicon ===
In 2015 Synopsys acquired the Finnish developer of security software Codenomicon. Codenomicon had itself previously acquired the Finnish software company Clarified Networks in 2011.

=== Cigital ===
Synopsys announced the acquisition of Cigital along with its 2015 spinoff Codiscope in November 2016. The suite of its software security products became part of Synopsys' software integrity group.

=== Sidense ===
Synopsys announced the acquisition of Ottawa-based-Sidense in October 2017. Sidense had developed a One-Time Programmable (OTP) Non-Volatile Memory (NVM) IP solution proven in technologies from 180 nm down to 16 nm. A patented split-channel 1T-Fuse bit-cell offers low power, small area, and access times as fast as 10ns.

=== QuantumWise ===
In 2017 Synopsys acquired the atomic-scale modeling software company QuantumWise (former Atomistix), which provides tools for quantum-based and classical simulations in the field of material science.

=== Black Duck Software ===
Black Duck Software was a privately held company focused on automating the process of identifying and creating an inventory of open source code used in software applications, as well as detecting known security vulnerabilities and license compliance issues. It ran the Open Hub website. The company was founded by Doug Levin. Black Duck Software was acquired by Synopsys in December 2017 for $565 million and integrated into the Software Integrity Group (SIG) until it was spun out. In October 2024, the private equity firms Clearlake Capital and Francisco Partners completed the acquisition of the Synopsys Software Integrity Group (SIG) to reestablish Black Duck Software as an independent standalone application security company. The transaction, first announced in May 2024, was valued at up to $2.1 billion, including $475 million in cash.

=== WhiteHat Security ===
In April 2022, Synopsys announced the acquisition of WhiteHat Security for $330 million. WhiteHat Security was founded in 2001 and provides application security as well as insights for DevOps teams.

=== PikeTec ===
In 2023, Synopsys completed the acquisition of PikeTec, a provider of verification and testing tools for automotive software.

=== Intrinsic ID ===
In March 2024, Synopsys announced it had acquired the Internet of things digital authentication company Intrinsic ID for an undisclosed amount.

=== Ansys ===
In January 2024, Synopsys announced its intention to acquire engineering software company Ansys for $35 billion. That would expand Synopsys' prominence in simulation software and systems design for chip designers, automobiles, airplanes. The companies have had a research and development partnership since 2017.

The Federal Trade Commission required Synopsys to divest certain assets as part of the acquisition. Under the proposed consent order, Synopsys agreed to divest its optical and photonic software tools, while Ansys divested its PowerArtist power consumption analysis tool. In September 2024, Synopsys announced it would sell its optical systems division to Keysight Technologies to address regulatory concerns.

In January 2025, Synopsys announced that the European Commission had approved its proposed $35 Billion acquisition of Ansys in Phase 1, marking significant progress in obtaining regulatory clearances for the merger. The company also reported that the UK Competition and Markets Authority had provisionally accepted remedies for Phase 1 approval, and the waiting period under the U.S. Hart-Scott-Rodino Antitrust Improvements Act had expired. While actively working with the U.S. Federal Trade Commission (FTC) on proposed remedies review, Synopsys noted that China's State Administration for Market Regulation had officially accepted their merger filing. The acquisition aimed to address growing customer demands for integrated Electronic Design Automation and Simulation and Analysis software solutions. The acquisition was completed on July 17, 2025.

== Export control restrictions ==
In May 2025, in the context of trade negotiations with China, the US government briefly paused the issuing of licenses for exports of airplane and semiconductor technology to China, which impacted Synopsys and its competitors. Synopsys suspended its financial guidance after receiving a letter from the Bureau of Industry and Security informing it of new export restrictions related to China. According to an internal memo obtained by Reuters, Synopsys told staff in China to halt services and sales in the country and stop taking new orders to comply with the new restrictions, which took effect on May 29, 2025. The restrictions broadly prohibited sales of Synopsys products and services to China, affecting all customers in the country. However, in July 2025, the U.S. government rescinded these export controls, allowing Synopsys and other electronic design automation companies to resume sales to China.

== See also ==
- List of EDA companies
- Comparison of EDA software
- List of tools for static code analysis
- Security information and event management
- Dynamic application security testing
