= Lawrence Pileggi =

- Born: March 14, 1962 (age 64)
- Occupations: Professor, Academic, Engineer
- Awards: IEEE Fellow, SRC Technical Excellence (1991 and 1999), Aristotle Award, IEEE Van Valkenburg Award, SIA University Researcher Award, Newton Industrial Impact Award

Academic background
- Education: B.S. and M.S. in electrical engineering from the University of Pittsburgh, Ph.D. in electrical and computer engineering from Carnegie Mellon University (CMU)
- Alma mater: Carnegie Mellon University
- Doctoral advisor: Ronald A. Rohrer

Lawrence Pileggi (born Lawrence Pillage, March 14, 1962) is the Coraluppi Head and Tanoto Professor of Electrical and Computer Engineering at Carnegie Mellon University. His research is in the automation of integrated circuits, and developing software tools for the optimization of power grids. He is also a Senior Energy Fellow at CMU's Scott Institute and has contributed to the modernization of electric grid analysis and simulation methods.

== Education ==
Pileggi received B.S. and M.S. degrees in electrical engineering from the University of Pittsburgh in 1983 and 1984, respectively. He received his Ph.D. in electrical and computer engineering from Carnegie Mellon University (CMU) in 1989. His thesis work was the development of the Asymptotic Waveform Evaluation (AWE) algorithm. The published paper that described this work received the 1991 IEEE Transactions on CAD Paper Award.

== Career ==
Pileggi worked as an IC design engineer at Westinghouse Research and Development, Pittsburgh, PA, from 1984 to 1986.

After receiving his PhD, Pileggi became an assistant professor of electrical and computer engineering at the University of Texas at Austin in 1989. There he and his students developed the open source software tool, RICE, or Rapid Interconnect Circuits Evaluation. RICE was recognized with a 1993 Semiconductor Research Corporation Invention Award. Most of his early research at UT Austin focused on RICE and various aspects of timing analysis, including the concept of effective capacitance for delay calculation purposes.

In 1996, Pileggi returned to CMU as an associate professor of electrical and computer engineering. While at CMU, Pileggi and his students developed new methods of model order reduction such as the PRIMA algorithm, based on Krylov subspace methods, which further extends model order reduction of circuits. His paper about PRIMA was awarded the 1999 IEEE Donald O. Pederson Best Paper Award.

Pileggi led the development of design methods for regular fabrics that could accommodate the nanoscale patterning for integrated circuits as lithography for ICs was approaching fundamental limits. The MARCO/DARPA Gigascale Research Center honored him with their inaugural Richard A. Newton Industrial Impact Award in 2007 for his regular fabrics work. His regular fabrics research was also the catalyst for launching a startup company, Fabbrix, with five of his former students, which was acquired by PDF Solutions in 2007.

In 2005, Pileggi co-founded Xigmix, a startup that was focused on statistical design methods for analog and mixed-mode circuits. In 2007, Xigmix was acquired by Extreme DA, another startup company founded by Pileggi and former students and colleagues; it focused on the development of new methods for statistical timing analysis of digital circuits and was acquired by Synopsys in 2011. Pileggi served as founder and advisor to the CEO of Extreme DA from 2004 until its acquisition in 2010.

From 2009 to 2013, Pileggi served as the director of the Center for Circuit and System Solutions (C2S2), one of six national centers for advanced research funded by the Semiconductor Research Corporation's (SRC) Focus Center Research Program (FCRP).

Pileggi's more recent research work has been developing a "split circuit" approach to the national electric grid that enables the application of circuit simulation techniques. This work was recognized by a Best Paper Award at the 2017 IEEE Power and Energy Society General Meeting, and it also served as the foundation for the startup company Pearl Street Technologies, which he founded in 2018 with two of his former students. Pileggi served as Chairman of Pearl Street Technologies until the company was acquired by Enverus in March 2025.

His recent work has produced new methods for power systems analysis and control that include circuit-theoretic modeling, optimization, and anomaly detection in the electric grid. His research has proposed solutions for steady-state simulation, optimal power flow with energy storage, and federated learning models for power infrastructure.

He has co-authored numerous award-winning papers in IEEE Transactions on Power Systems between 2021 and 2023 and has participated in high-profile conferences including IEEE PES General Meetings, Power Systems Computation Conference (PSCC), and NeurIPS.

In 2023, he co-authored Chapter 17 of the book “Power Systems Operation with 100% Renewable Energy Sources,” further contributing to renewable grid design.

His recent startup and research initiatives are supported by organizations including the U.S. Office of the Secretary of Defense and the Department of Energy.

He served as a member of the Defense Microelectronics Advisory Group (2021–2023) and currently serves on the ME Commons Board of Service Executives (BSE).

Pillegi contributed to the development of the SUGAR (Simulation with Unified Grid Analyses and Renewables) tool, used to model and analyze electric power systems with high levels of renewable energy integration. His work on SUGAR informed a memorandum submitted to the Federal Energy Regulatory Commission (FERC) addressing grid resilience and the need for improved analytical tools in regulatory decision-making.

== Research ==
=== Interconnect Modeling and Simulation ===
Pileggi's doctoral thesis produced the Asymptotic Waveform Evaluation (AWE) algorithm, which approximates the response of linear RLC circuits by combining recursive moment computation with Padé approximation. Co-authored with his advisor Ronald A. Rohrer, the resulting paper received the 1991 IEEE Transactions on CAD Paper Award. At the University of Texas at Austin, he and his students developed RICE (Rapid Interconnect Circuits Evaluation), an open-source interconnect analysis tool, and introduced the concept of effective capacitance for delay calculation. Returning to CMU in 1996, his group developed PRIMA (Passive Reduced-Order Interconnect Macromodeling Algorithm), which uses Krylov subspace methods to produce reduced-order models of RLC circuits while guaranteeing passivity, a property required for stability when models are connected to other circuit components.

=== Integrated Circuit Design Methodologies ===
In the mid-2000s, Pileggi led research into design methods for regular fabrics, structured IC layouts intended to address patterning constraints at nanoscale dimensions. This work led to the startup Fabbrix, acquired by PDF Solutions in 2007. He also worked on statistical design methods for analog and mixed-mode circuits through the startup Xigmix (2005), and on statistical timing analysis for digital circuits through Extreme DA, both of which were subsequently acquired.

=== Electric Power Systems ===
Pileggi's group developed a split circuit formulation that models the grid in terms of currents and voltages rather than the power flow representations conventional in the field, with the aim of improving convergence and scalability for large-scale grid simulation. This work produced the SUGAR (Simulation with Unified Grid Analyses and Renewables) tool and formed the basis of Pearl Street Technologies, co-founded with David Bromberg and Hui Zheng in 2018 and acquired by Enverus in March 2025. In April 2020, Pileggi was named a Senior Energy Fellow at CMU's Scott Institute for Energy Innovation.

== Honors ==
His career began as an IC designer at Westinghouse Research, where he received the corporation’s highest engineering achievement award.

Pileggi's development of model order reduction methods resulted in the IEEE Circuits and Systems Society honoring him with the Mac Van Valkenburg Award in 2010. In 2012, the ACM/IEEE society awarded with the A. Richard Newton Technical Impact Award in Electronic Design Automation.

In 2021, he received two Best Paper Awards at the IEEE Power and Energy Society General Meeting, including the "Best-of-the-Best Paper Award".

In 2023, Pileggi was awarded the prestigious Phil Kaufman Award from the Electronic System Design Alliance and IEEE Council on EDA for his contributions to design automation.

He is a Fellow of the National Academy of Inventors as of November 2021.

- IEEE Fellow
- IEEE Transactions on CAD Paper Award, 1991
- SRC Technical Excellence, 1991 and 1999
- SRC Invention Award, 1993
- IEEE Donald O. Pederson Best Paper Award, 1999
- Newton Industrial Impact Award, 2007
- Aristotle Award, 2008
- IEEE Van Valkenburg Award, 2010
- National Academy of Inventors Fellow
- 2023: Phil Kaufman Award
- Presidential Young Investigator Award, National Science Foundation
- ACM/IEEE A. Richard Newton Technical Impact Award in Electronic Design Automation, 2011
- Carnegie Institute of Technology B.R. Teare Teaching Award, 2013
- Semiconductor Industry Association (SIA) University Researcher Award, 2015
- Casasent Outstanding Research Award, 2025

== Selected publications ==
Pileggi's research has been cited thousands of times in engineering papers.

- Pillage, L. T., & Rohrer, R. A. (1990). Asymptotic waveform evaluation for timing analysis. IEEE Transactions on Computer-Aided Design of Integrated Circuits and Systems, 9(4): 352–366.
- Odabasioglu, A., Celik, M., & Pileggi, L. T. (2003). PRIMA: Passive reduced-order interconnect macromodeling algorithm. In The Best of ICCAD (pp. 433–450). Springer, Boston, MA. ISBN 978-1-4615-0292-0
- Pillage, L. (1998). Electronic Circuit & System Simulation Methods (SRE). New York: McGraw-Hill, Inc. ISBN 978-0-07-134770-9
- Qian, J., Pullela, S., & Pillage, L. (1994). Modeling the" effective capacitance" for the rc interconnect of cmos gates. IEEE Transactions on Computer-Aided Design of Integrated Circuits and Systems, 13(12): 1526–1535.
- Celik, M., Pileggi, L., & Odabasioglu, A. (2002). IC interconnect analysis. Berlin, Germany: Springer Science & Business Media.
- Pileggi, L., & Schmit, H. (2003). U.S. Patent No. 6,633,182. Washington, DC: U.S. Patent and Trademark Office.
- Pileggi, L. T., Strojwas, A. J., & Lanza, L. L. (2011). U.S. Patent No. 7,906,254. Washington, DC: U.S. Patent and Trademark Office.
- Calhoun, B. H., Cao, Y., Li, X., Mai, K., Pileggi, L. T., Rutenbar, R. A., & Shepard, K. L. (2008). Digital circuit design challenges and opportunities in the era of nanoscale CMOS. Proceedings of the IEEE, 96(2): 343–365.
- Li, S., Pandey, A., & Pileggi, L. (2023). A convex method of generalized state estimation using circuit-theoretic node-breaker model. IEEE Transactions on Power Systems.
- Agarwal, A., Pandey, A., & Pileggi, L. (2023). Continuous switch model for mixed-integer nonlinear problems in power systems. IEEE Transactions on Power Systems.
- Pandey, A., & Pileggi, L. (2020). Steady-state simulation for combined transmission and distribution systems. IEEE Transactions on Smart Grid.
