= Robert Dutton (engineer) =

American electrical engineer

Robert W. Dutton is an American electrical engineer. At Stanford University, he is the Robert and Barbara Kleist Professor of Electrical Engineering, Emeritus. Dutton also served as the undergraduate advisor for Stanford University Department of Electrical Engineering, succeeded by John M. Pauly.

Dutton's research interests include the process of integrated circuits fabrication, and circuit and device design and technology.

In 1991, Dutton was elected a member of the National Academy of Engineering for pioneering contributions to the development of computer-aided modeling of semiconductor devices and fabrication processes.

== Education ==
Dutton attended University of California, Berkeley for his BS (1966), MS (1967), and PhD (1970).

Dutton came to Stanford in 1971.

== Career ==
Dutton's research combined fabricating requirements with material sensitivities. His team developed software to characterize the various permutations. The software resulting from Dutton's research; SUPREM, (Stanford University Process Engineering Models) and PISCES (Poisson and Continuity Equation Solver), were adopted by industry.

He founded Technology Modeling Associates (TMA), the first Technology CAD company. TMA was bought by Avant! Corp in 1997. TMA's President and CEO was Roy Jewell.

== Recognition ==
- IEEE Jun-ichi Nishizawa Medal (2025)
- Phil Kaufman Award, Electronic Design Automation Consortium (2006)
- Semiconductor Industry Association (SIA) University Researcher Award (2005) and University Leadership Award (2005)
- IEEE Jack A. Morton Award (1996)
- Member of the National Academy of Engineering 1991
- Guggenheim Fellowship for Natural Sciences (1988)
- IEEE J. J. Ebers Award (1987)

== Publications ==
- Qi, Xiaoning; Dutton, Robert W. (2003), "Interconnect Parasitic Extraction of Resistance, Capacitance, and Inductance", Interconnect Technology and Design for Gigascale Integration, Springer US, pp. 67–109, doi:10.1007/978-1-4615-0461-0_3, ISBN 9781461350880
- Dutton, Robert W.; Yu, Zhiping (2012-12-06). Technology CAD — Computer Simulation of IC Processes and Devices. Springer Science & Business Media. ISBN 9781461532088.
- Dutton, Robert (2012-12-06). "Tool Integration for Power Device Modeling Including 3D Aspects". In Jaecklin, A. A. (ed.). Power Semiconductor Devices and Circuits. Springer Science & Business Media. ISBN 9781461533221.
- More publications.
