= Phil Kaufman =

Phil Kaufman may refer to:

- Philip Kaufman (born 1936), American film director and screenwriter
- Philip A. Kaufman (1942–1992), American engineer
  - Phil Kaufman Award, electronic design automation award
- Phil Kaufman (producer) (born 1935), American music producer and manager
