= Phil Kaufman Award =

Annual award in electronic design automation

- Description: Honoring distinguished contributions to electronic design automation (EDA)
- Country: United States (International impact)
- Presented by: Electronic System Design Alliance (ESDA) & IEEE CEDA

The Phil Kaufman Award for Distinguished Contributions to EDA honors individuals for their impact on electronic design by their contributions to electronic design automation (EDA). It was established in 1994 by the EDA Consortium (now the Electronic System Design Alliance, a SEMI Technology Community). The IEEE Council on Electronic Design Automation (CEDA) became a co-sponsor of the award. The first Phil Kaufman Award was presented in 1994.

== Honors and qualifications ==
The IEEE has a policy not to issue awards to deceased persons. To honor individuals who made a significant impact on EDA, but died before the award was established the Phil Kaufman Hall of Fame was created by the ESDA in 2020. The first Hall of Fame honor was presented in June 2021. Phil Kaufman awardees are included in the Phil Kaufman Hall of Fame.

Contributions to qualify for the Phil Kaufman Award are evaluated in any of the following categories:

- Business
- Industry Direction and Promotion
- Technology and Engineering
- Educational and Mentoring

The award was established to honor Phil Kaufman, the deceased former president of Quickturn Systems.

The award is described as the "Nobel Prize of EDA".

== Recipients ==
All recipients are listed at the ESDA Phil Kaufman Award webpage.

- 1994 – Hermann Gummel
- 1995 – Donald Pederson
- 1996 – Carver Mead
- 1997 – James Solomon
- 1998 – Ernest S. Kuh for contributions to circuit layout theory and algorithms in partitioning, floorplanning, placement and routing
- 1999 – Hugo De Man, known for his contributions in creating and driving the development of design automation tools that have had measurable impact on the productivity of electronic design engineers.
- 2000 – Paul (Yen-Son) Huang
- 2001 – Alberto Sangiovanni-Vincentelli for his contributions to circuit simulation, computer aided design of integrated circuits, logic synthesis, and system design
- 2002 – Ronald A. Rohrer, electronic industry pioneer, entrepreneur, researcher and educator, who supervised students' circuit simulator projects that resulted in the development of SPICE.
- 2003 – A. Richard Newton for his support and contributions to the EDA industry
- 2004 – Joseph Costello business contributions that helped grow the EDA industry
- 2005 – Phil Moorby, inventor of Verilog
- 2006 – Robert Dutton, creator of SUPREM (Stanford University Process Engineering Models) and PISCES (Poisson and Continuity Equation Solver) simulation tools and software used in Technology Computer Aided Design.
- 2007 – Robert K. Brayton, known for work in logic synthesis, formal verification and formal equivalence checking. Co-developer of Espresso.
- 2008 – Aart de Geus, Synopsys CEO for contributions to the EDA industry, more specifically the Design Compiler tool.
- 2009 – Randal Bryant, CMU professor, for his seminal technological breakthroughs in the area of formal verification.
- 2010 – Pat Pistilli, for pioneering the EDA industry and building the Design Automation Conference as its premiere showcase and networking platform.
- 2011 – Chung Laung Liu, for his Distinguished Technical Contributions, Leadership Skills, and Business Acumen in Electronic Design Automation.
- 2013 – Chenming Hu, for major contributions to transistor modeling enabling the generation of FinFET based design.
- 2014 – Lucio Lanza, for helping numerous startups to develop innovative technologies.
- 2015 – Walden C. Rhines, CEO of Mentor Graphics, for his efforts growing the EDA and IC design industries.
- 2016 – Andrzej Strojwas, CMU professor and chief technologist of PDF Solutions, for his research in the area of design for manufacturing in the semiconductor industry.
- 2017 – Rob Rutenbar, for his contributions to algorithms and tools for analog and mixed-signal designs.
- 2018 – Thomas Williams, for his outstanding contributions to test automation and his overall impact on the electronics industry.
- 2019 – Mary Jane Irwin, Pennsylvania State University, for her extensive contributions to EDA and the community.
- 2020 – Hiatus due to COVID-19 pandemic
- 2021 – Anirudh Devgan, Cadence Design Systems CEO for Distinguished Contributions to Electronic System Design.
- 2022 – Giovanni De Micheli, for his significant impact on the electronic system design industry through pioneering technical contributions.
- 2023 - Lawrence Pileggi, "for his pioneering contributions to circuit simulation and optimization. These advances have enabled the electronics system design industry to address the challenge of interconnect delay dominated designs."
- 2024 - Jason Cong, for fundamental contributions to FPGA design automation technology
- 2025 - Lip-Bu Tan

== See also ==
- List of computer-related awards
- List of engineering awards
