= Procom =

Procom, ProCom or PROCOM may refer to:

- Processes of Compounds (PROCOM), a process simulation software package; see Crosslight Software § PROCOM
- ProCom, the Promotion Commission of the World Association for Waterborne Transport Infrastructure
- Procom Technology, a company acquired by Sun Microsystems in 2005
- Protective Security Command (ProCom), a Singapore counter terrorism police unit
