= Anirudh Devgan =

Indian-American computer scientist and business executive

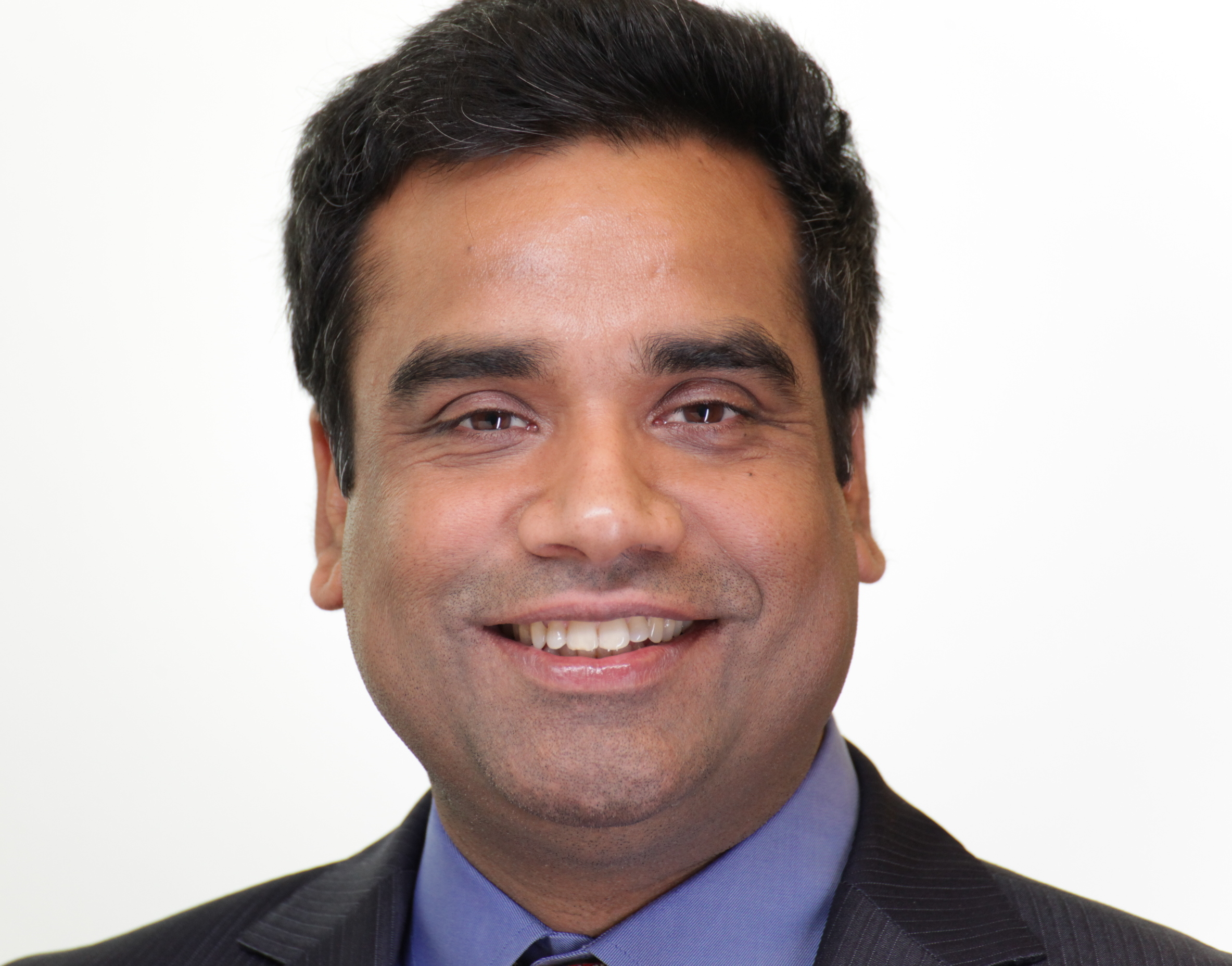
- Born: September 15, 1969 (age 56); New Delhi, India
- Education: IIT Delhi (B.Tech); Carnegie Mellon University (MS, PhD)
- Occupations: Business executive, computer scientist
- Years active: 1990s-present
- Known for: Research on electronic design automation
- Title: CEO and President of Cadence Design Systems
- Board member of: ESD Alliance, Global Semiconductor Alliance

Anirudh Devgan (born September 15, 1969) is an Indian-American computer scientist and business executive. As a scientist, Devgan is known for his contributions to electronic design automation, specifically circuit simulation, physical design and signoff, statistical design and optimization, and verification and hardware platforms. A fellow of the Institute of Electrical and Electronics Engineers, he is also member of the National Academy of Engineering.

Since 2021, Devgan has served as president and CEO of Cadence Design Systems, and previously worked at IBM and Magma Design Automation. He serves on the boards of the Global Semiconductor Alliance and the ESD Alliance.

== Early life and education ==
Anirudh Devgan was born on September 15, 1969 in India. He spent his childhood in New Delhi, where his father was a professor at the Indian Institute of Technology Delhi (IIT Delhi). After attending Delhi Public School (DPS), he attended IIT Delhi from 1986 until 1990, graduating with a Bachelor of Technology degree in electrical engineering.

Moving to the United States to attend Carnegie Mellon University in Pennsylvania, at Carnegie Mellon he earned his Master's Degree (1990-1991) and Ph.D (1991-1993) in electrical and computer engineering. He began attending the Stanford Graduate School of Business in 2018.

== Career ==
=== IBM and Magma Design Automation ===
After graduating with his Ph.D., Devgan's first job was working for IBM Research in Yorktown Heights, New York starting in 1994. He did research for several years before moving into a product group within International Business Machines Corporation (IBM). He ultimately spent 12 years at IBM in management and research, working at divisions such as the IBM Thomas J. Watson Research Center, the IBM Server Division, the IBM Microelectronics Division, and the IBM Austin Research Lab. At IBM, his research on electronic design automation (EDA) algorithms and design optimisation techniques "contributed to IBM’s leadership in the 1990s and 2000s in high-performance microprocessor and server designs."

Devgan joined Magma Design Automation in 2005, where he held various roles such as Corporate Vice President and General Manager of the company's Custom Design Business Unit. During his seven years at Magma, he "initiated and brought to market multiple new products in the areas of circuit simulation, analog mixed-signal design, physical verification, library characterisation and 3D extraction among others."

=== Cadence Design Systems ===
In 2012, Devgan joined Cadence Design Systems, a software development company based in San Jose, California that focuses on tools to aid in chip design. Holding a number of senior leadership roles, he initially served as executive vice president and general manager of the company's Digital & Signoff Group and System Verification Group.

He was named Cadence president in November 2017. The role gave him oversight of Cadence’s EDA products, as well as corporate strategy, marketing and business development. Devgan joined the Cadence board of directors in August 2021, and in December 2021 he was promoted to CEO. He succeeded Lip-Bu Tan. Devgan had established Cadence's Intelligent System Design strategy by 2022, focusing on incorporating artificial intelligence and machine learning into the company's products and software platforms. Under Devgan, in 2022 the Cadence Giving Foundation donated $3.7 million to various initiatives, and the following year, Cadence invested $50 million in a racial equity fund managed by the Royal Bank of Canada and Global Asset Management.

By 2023, Devgan had been quoted by publications such as The New York Times on matters relating to software and chip manufacturing. Interviewed for CNBC's Closing Bell about Cadence's financials in February 2023, Devgan asserted that almost any chip designed in the world was done so with Cadence software. He appeared again on CNBC in May 2023 on Mad Money with Jim Cramer, again to discuss the semiconductor industry and Cadence. In September 2023, he was quoted by Bloomberg stating the US should invest more in semiconductor packaging to ensure it was leading in areas such as artificial intelligence. In 2023, he was ranked the fifth highest-paid CEO of Indian nationality. He was a speaker at the J.P. Morgan Global Technology Media and Communications Conference in May 2024.

== Research ==
Much of Devgan's research is centered on electronic design automation (EDA), with contributions in areas such as circuit simulation, physical design and signoff, statistical design and optimization, and verification and hardware platforms, among others. His contributions include results in parallel, distributed and cloud computing for commercial EDA applications the cloud computing era. Devgan holds 27 U.S. patents and has received best paper awards from both the Design Automation Conference (DAC) and International Conference on Computer Aided Design (ICCAD).

== Boards ==
He currently serves on the boards of the Global Semiconductor Alliance and the ESD Alliance. In August 2022, the American Heart Association named him chair of the Heart of the Bay fundraising campaign.

== Awards and honors ==
Announced in November 2006, in 2007 he was elected an IEEE Fellow for "contributions to electrical analysis, and simulation of integrated circuits." He then received the 2021 Phil Kaufman Award for his contributions to electronic design automation, and in 2023 was elected a member of the National Academy of Engineering "for technical and business leadership in the electronic design automation industry."

== Personal life ==
Devgan resides in the Bay Area of California.

== See also ==
- List of IIT Delhi people
- IBM alumni
