= Aart de Geus =

Dutch businessman (born 1954)

Aart J. de Geus
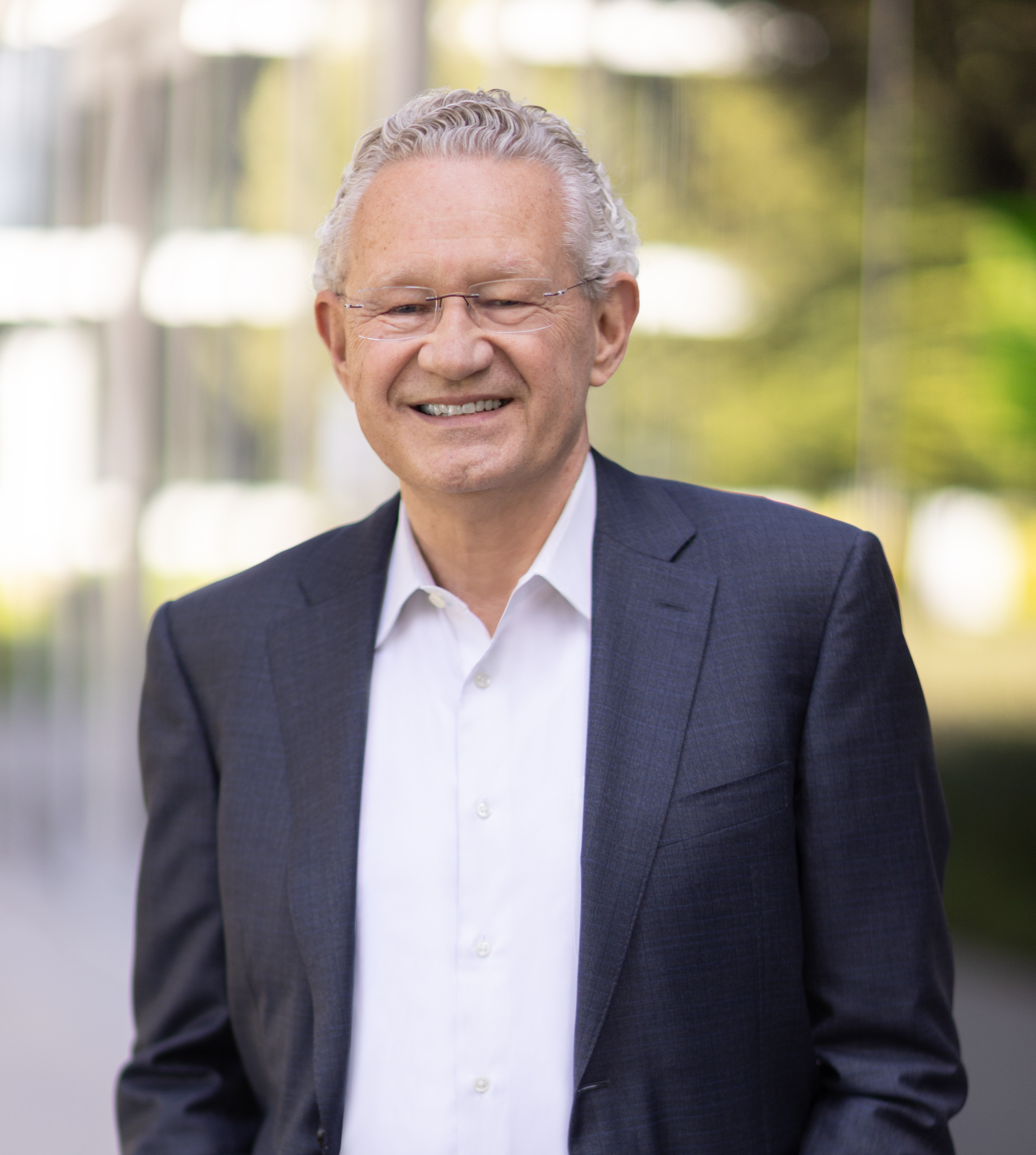
- Born: June 1954 (age 72); Vlaardingen, Netherlands
- Education: École Polytechnique Fédérale de Lausanne; Southern Methodist University
- Occupations: Businessman and electrical engineer
- Known for: Founder and Executive Chair, Synopsys Inc.

Aart J. de Geus (born June 1954) is a co-founder and executive chair of Synopsys Inc., where he was CEO until January 2024.

De Geus graduated with a master's degree in electrical engineering (1978) from the École Polytechnique Fédérale de Lausanne (Swiss Federal Institute of technology), EPFL, Switzerland followed by a Ph.D. from Southern Methodist University, Texas, United States, in 1985. De Geus was awarded an honorary Doctorate of Science degree from the University of Glasgow in 2022.

De Geus is one of the original pioneers of electronic design automation (EDA), the software tools used in the semiconductor industry to design chips. De Geus was elected a member of the National Academy of Engineering in 2019 for leadership and technical contributions to logic synthesis for integrated circuits. He is also a fellow of IEEE and a Phil Kaufman Award winner. He received the IEEE Robert N. Noyce Medal for his leadership in the technology and business development of EDA, as well as the Robert N. Noyce award from the Semiconductor Industry Association. He is a board member of the Global Semiconductor Association (GSA) and the Silicon Valley Leadership Group.

De Geus is also the lead guitarist of Silicon Valley's 'Legally Blue' blues band.

== Early life ==
De Geus was born in Vlaardingen, Netherlands. He emigrated to the French-speaking part of Switzerland at age 4 in 1958 and then to the German-speaking town of Basel for high school and undergraduate studies where he went to the Swiss Federal Institute of Technology Lausanne. In 1979, Aart moved to the United States for grad school. As a result, de Geus speaks multiple languages, including English, German, Swiss-German, French, and Dutch. De Geus completed his undergraduate degree at the Swiss Federal Institute of Technology in Switzerland and earned his master's in electrical engineering from the École Polytechnique Fédérale de Lausanne. He received his Ph.D. at Southern Methodist University (SMU).

At SMU, de Geus met the Electrical Computer Engineering Department chair, Ron Rohrer. Rohrer was the father of the circuit simulation program SPICE and became de Geus' academic advisor for his education and early career. While remaining a professor at SMU, Rohrer joined General Electric (GE) in 1982. After completing his coursework, de Geus followed Rohrer to GE while finishing his Ph.D. dissertation at night in 1985.

== Career ==
De Geus started his career at GE with Rohrer, leading a team that developed tools including the Synthesis and Optimization of Combinational logic, using a Rule-based and Technology-independent Expert System (SOCRATES) synthesis program.

When GE removed itself from the semiconductor business, de Geus met with Ed Hood, Vice Chair of GE, and convinced GE to support a spin-off of the synthesis technology with an additional $400,000 investment in return for equity in a new venture. With two members of his original GE team, David Gregory and Bill Krieger, de Geus founded Optimal Solutions Inc. in Research Triangle Park, North Carolina on December 18, 1986.

In 1987, the company moved to Silicon Valley and was renamed Synopsys, combining the terms Synthesis and Optimization Systems. When the company went public on February 26, 1992, de Geus turned GE's initial investment into $23 million. As of 2024, Synopsys has over 100 global offices, annual sales topping $5.8 billion in revenue, and over 20,000 employees worldwide.

As Synopsys' CEO, de Geus led the company through several phases, including commercializing automated logic synthesis, expanding its product portfolio, and navigating acquisitions. De Geus grew the company from a small, one-product start-up to a provider of IC design tools, semiconductor IP, and application security solutions. He credits working on a farm during his youth every summer for learnings and principles he applied to Synopsys' corporate culture.

He frequently speaks at major electronics and design automation conferences and has authored over 25 papers on logic synthesis, simulation, timing, and interconnect delay. During his keynote at the Hot Chips Conference in 2021, de Geus introduced advances in using artificial intelligence (AI) in semiconductor design automation.

In May 2022, he gave the opening remarks on accelerating U.S. semiconductor innovation during the President's Council of Advisors on Science and Technology meeting. Later that year, he attended the CHIPS and Science Act signing by President Joe Biden at The White House on August 9, 2022.

== Directorship ==
De Geus has been on the Synopsys board since the company's founding in 1986. De Geus led Synopsys for over three and a half decades, as the company shifted from computer-aided design to electronic design automation, designed circuits for different foundries, and completed over 100 M&A transactions.

Since 2007, de Geus has been on the board of directors of Applied Materials and is a member of the strategy committee.

He is a longtime member and former two-time chair of the Silicon Valley Leadership Group, formerly the Silicon Valley Manufacturing Group, where he led the effort to give teachers paid summer fellowships at electronics companies.

De Geus is also a board member of the Global Semiconductor Alliance (GSA), the Electronic System Design Alliance (ESDA), and a member of the National Academy of Engineering.

== Philanthropy ==
In 1999, de Geus founded the Synopsys Silicon Valley Science and Technology Outreach Foundation (also known as the Synopsys Science Foundation), which helps students and teachers in Santa Clara County learn about science and math through a project-based curriculum and supplies annual grants to teachers and public schools to hold science fairs.

De Geus and his wife Esther are regular donors to the Cancer Prevention Institute of California, Second Harvest of Silicon Valley, and Planned Parenthood, and are on the Silicon Valley Human Rights Watch Committee.

De Geus addresses climate change during keynotes and is a donor to the Environmental Defense Fund. He helped spearhead green initiatives at Synopsys, including investing in renewable energy sources in North America and India, which now represent about 50% of Synopsys' North American electricity supply.

He also was a part of Synopsys' commitment to become carbon neutral and limit global warming to 1.5 °C.

== Awards and honors ==
Business and Semiconductor Industry

After becoming an Institute of Electrical and Electronics Engineers (IEEE) fellow in 1999, he was honored for pioneering the commercial logic synthesis market, becoming the third recipient of the IEEE Circuits and Systems Society Industrial Pioneer Award in 2001. De Geus is the recipient of the 2007 IEEE Robert N. Noyce Medal for contributions to, and leadership in, the technology and business development of EDA. In 2024, he received the Robert N. Noyce award from the Semiconductor Industry Association.

Electronic Business magazine chose de Geus as one of "The 10 Most Influential Executives" of 2002. Also in 2002, shortly after handling the largest merger in electronic design automation history, de Geus was named CEO of the Year by Electronic Business magazine. In 2004 he was named Entrepreneur of the Year in IT for Northern California by Ernst & Young. The Electronic System Design Association (ESDA) awarded de Geus the 2008 Phil Kaufman Award for his business and technical impact on the EDA industry. In 2009, he received the Global Semiconductor Alliance (GSA) Morris Chang Exemplary Leadership Award.

He was also awarded the Silicon Valley Engineering Council Hall of Fame Award in 2013, became a member of the National Academy of Engineering for leadership and technical contributions to logic synthesis for integrated circuits in 2019, and earned an honorary Doctorate of Science from the University of Glasgow in 2022.

Community

In 2007, de Geus received the Silicon Valley Leadership Group (SVLG) "Spirit of the Valley" Lifetime Achievement Award.

In 2011, he accepted the Joint Venture Silicon Valley Network's David Packard Award for civic entrepreneurship.

== Personal life ==
De Geus has two siblings and is married to Esther John, Ph.D. MSPH, a Professor of Epidemiology & Population Health and Medicine and co-leader of the Population Sciences Program of the Stanford Cancer Institute.

He discovered music at a young age; in 1972, he was inspired by T Bone Walker, the first notable electric guitar blues musician in the early 1940s. In 1973, de Geus met American jazz guitarist Barney Kessel at a music festival who advised de Geus to learn from people better than himself and then share that knowledge with others.

In 1978, de Geus' band called 'Black Cat Bone Blues Band' won first prize in the Blues category at the Swiss National Amateur Jazz and Rock Festival Final. The band also accompanied the Chicago veteran piano musician Sunnyland Slim on the Swiss leg of his European tour.

In 2008, de Geus played at the San Jose Jazz Festival a part of a CEO jam, which included CEO of Valley Medical Foundation Chris Wilder as the bass player.

Today, de Geus is the lead guitarist of Silicon Valley's 'Legally Blue' blues band. Legally Blue has played pro-bono at several fundraising events, supporting CityYear, the Stroke Awareness Foundation, the San Jose Jazz organization, Doctors Without Borders, and more.
