= Wally Rhines =

American engineer and businessman (born 1946)

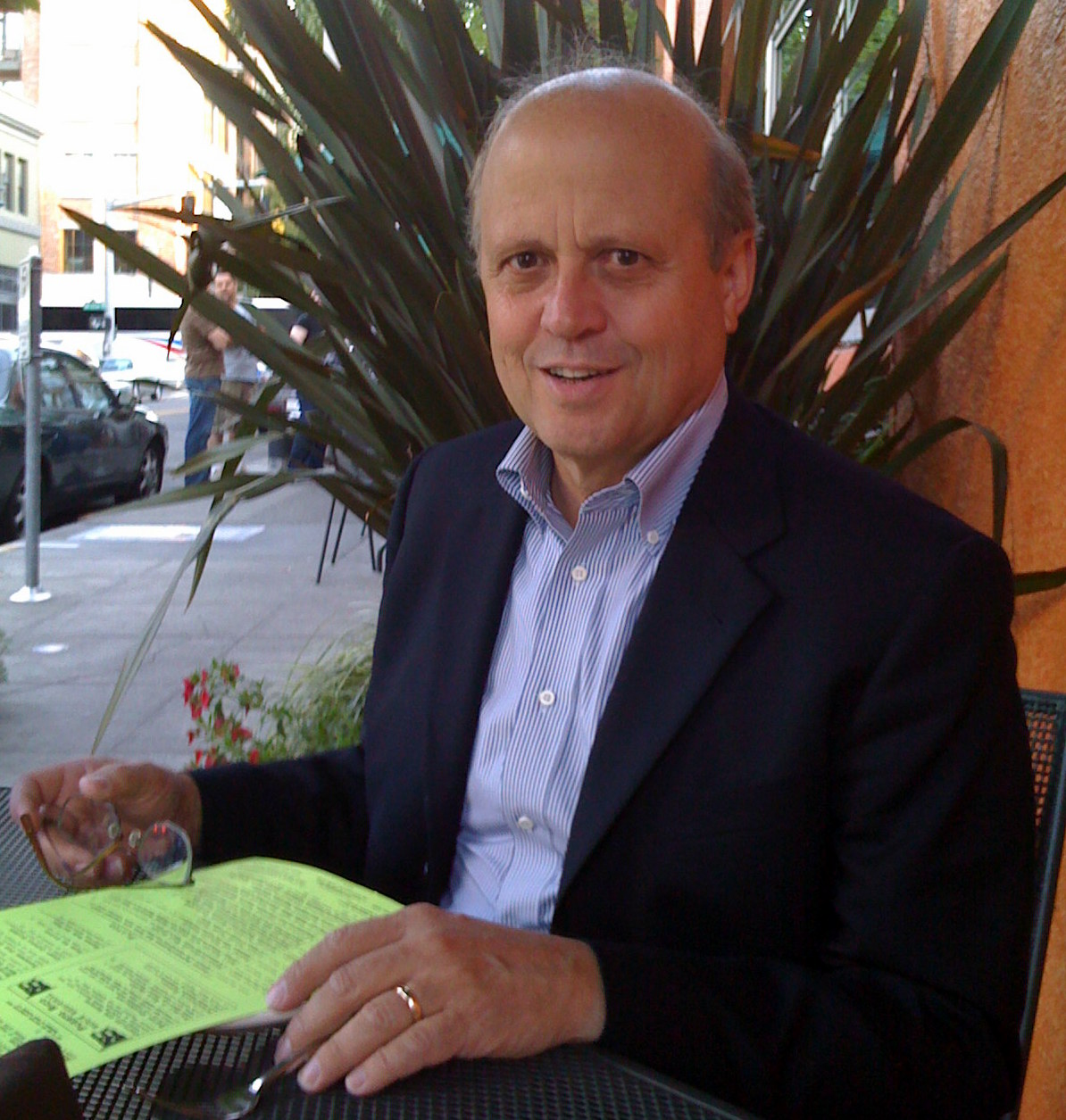
- Cornami, Inc. President & CEO Wally Rhines in Portland, Oregon
- Born: November 11, 1946 (age 79); Pittsburgh, Pennsylvania, U.S.
- Education: University of Michigan; Stanford University; Southern Methodist University
- Title: President and CEO of Cornami, Inc.
- Website: www.cornami.com

Walden C. "Wally" Rhines (born November 11, 1946) is an American engineer and businessman. He is the president and CEO of Cornami, Inc., a fabless semiconductor company focused on fully homomorphic encryption. Previously, he was the president and CEO of Mentor Graphics, a Siemens Business for 23 years and Executive VP of the Semiconductor Group of Texas Instruments for 21 years. Rhines was named overall CEO of the Year by Portland Business Journal in 2012 and Oregon Technology Executive of the Year by the Technology Association of Oregon in 2003. He was named an IEEE Fellow in 2017.

== Early life and education ==
Rhines was born in Pittsburgh, Pennsylvania. His father, Frederick N. Rhines, was the Alcoa professor of light metals at the Carnegie Institute of Technology from 1946 to 1959 and founder of the department of materials science and engineering at the University of Florida, from which he retired in 1978; today the department is housed in Frederick N. Rhines Hall. Rhines earned his bachelor of science in engineering (BSE) from the University of Michigan in 1968 and his master's degree and Ph.D. in materials science and engineering from Stanford University in 1970 and 1972, respectively. He earned his M.B.A. from Southern Methodist University in 1975.

== Career ==
While at Stanford, Rhines co-invented the magnesium-doped gallium nitride blue light-emitting diode, for which he, Herb Maruska and David Stevenson were awarded a U.S. patent in 1974. Isamu Akasaki built directly on this gallium-nitride research and eventually won the 2014 Nobel Prize in Physics, along with Hiroshi Amano and Shuji Nakamura.

Rhines worked at Texas Instruments (TI) from 1972 to 1993, serving as executive vice president of the semiconductor group and president of the data systems group. While at TI, Rhines supervised development of speech synthesis chips used in the Speak & Spell; developed the first publicly available computer program (for a calculator) to calculate the Black–Scholes value of a stock option; and supervised the creation of the TMS320 digital signal processor. In a 1985 profile of Rhines in the Austin American-Statesman, industry consultant Will Strauss told reporter Russell Mitchell: "He [Rhines] can claim the TMS-320 digital signal processor chip; that's the one to beat on the street right now."

Rhines became CEO of Mentor Graphics in 1993, when the company's annual revenue was about $340 million. The company passed $1 billion in revenue for the first time in 2011. In 2013 Mentor Graphics announced it would begin paying a quarterly dividend, making it the only of big three electronic design automation (EDA) companies to do so; (Cadence Design Systems and Synopsys are the other two).

Siemens announced its $4.5 billion acquisition of Mentor Graphics on November 13, 2016; the deal closed four months later. Rhines remained as CEO of Mentor, a Siemens Business and later CEO Emeritus through 2020.

Rhines joined the many-core accelerator chip company Cornami as CEO in March 2020.

== Affiliations ==
Rhines has been elected five times (1996, 2002, 2004, 2008, 2010) to serve two-year terms as chair of the Electronic Design Automation Consortium, the international trade association for the EDA industry. He is a board member of TriQuint Semiconductor (1995–2015) and QORVO (2015–present). Previously he served on the boards of SEMATECH (1989-1993), the Semiconductor Research Corporation (2002–2020), Cirrus Logic (1995–2009), the Global Semiconductor Alliance (2007–2010), Global Logic Inc. (2014–2017) and the Computer and Business Equipment Manufacturers Association, now known as the International Committee for Information Technology Standards (1984–1987). From 1996 to 2005 Rhines was a trustee at Lewis & Clark College, where he remains a life trustee today and he serves on the Executive Advisory Board of the Lyle College of Engineering at Southern Methodist University.

== Philanthropy ==
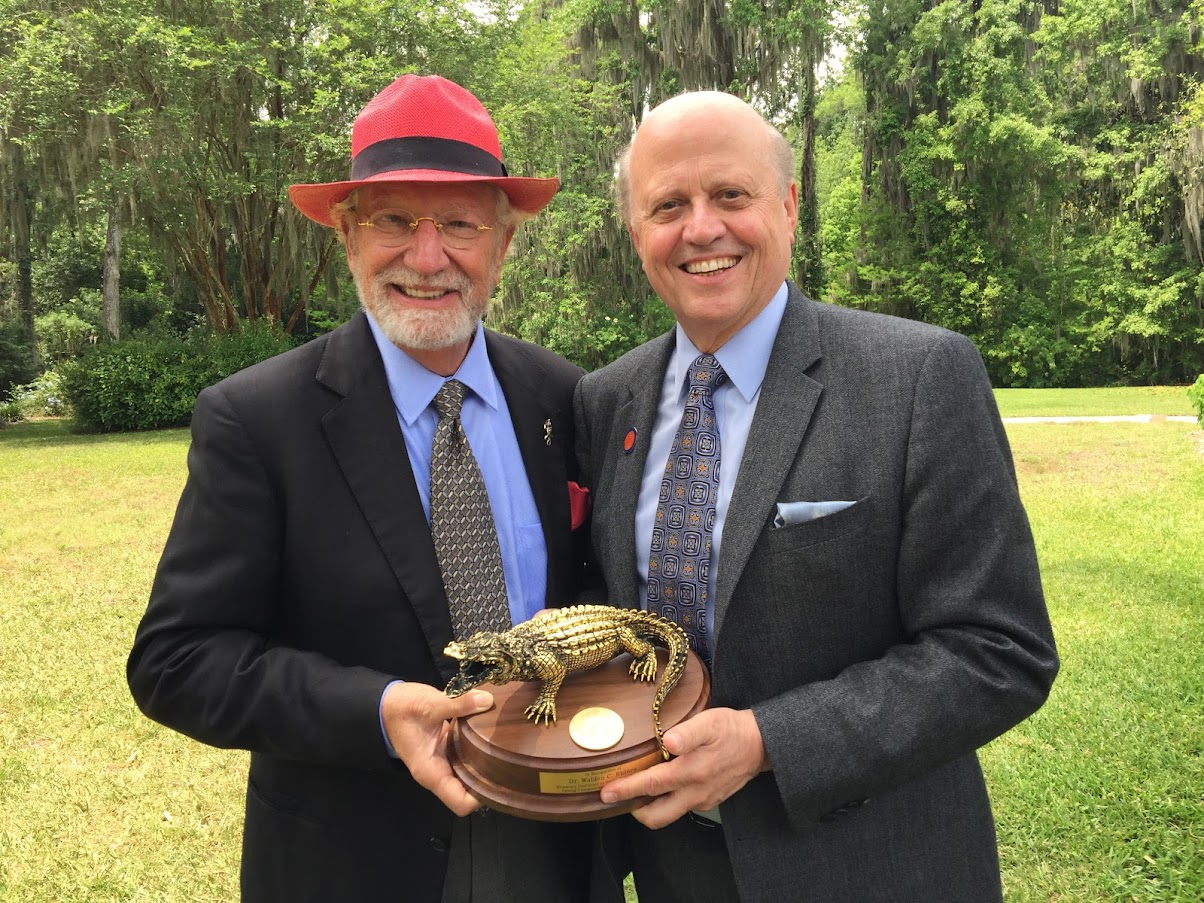
Herbert Wertheim and Wally Rhines at University of Florida in 2016.

In memory of his father, Rhines endowed a graduate fellowship in engineering at the University of Michigan in 2016 and four professorships at the University of Florida, including one in 2021 in fully homomorphic encryption in the Herbert Wertheim College of Engineering. From 1996 to 2020 he served on the board of Classic Wines Auction in Portland, which supports a variety of children and family charities.

== Awards and honors ==
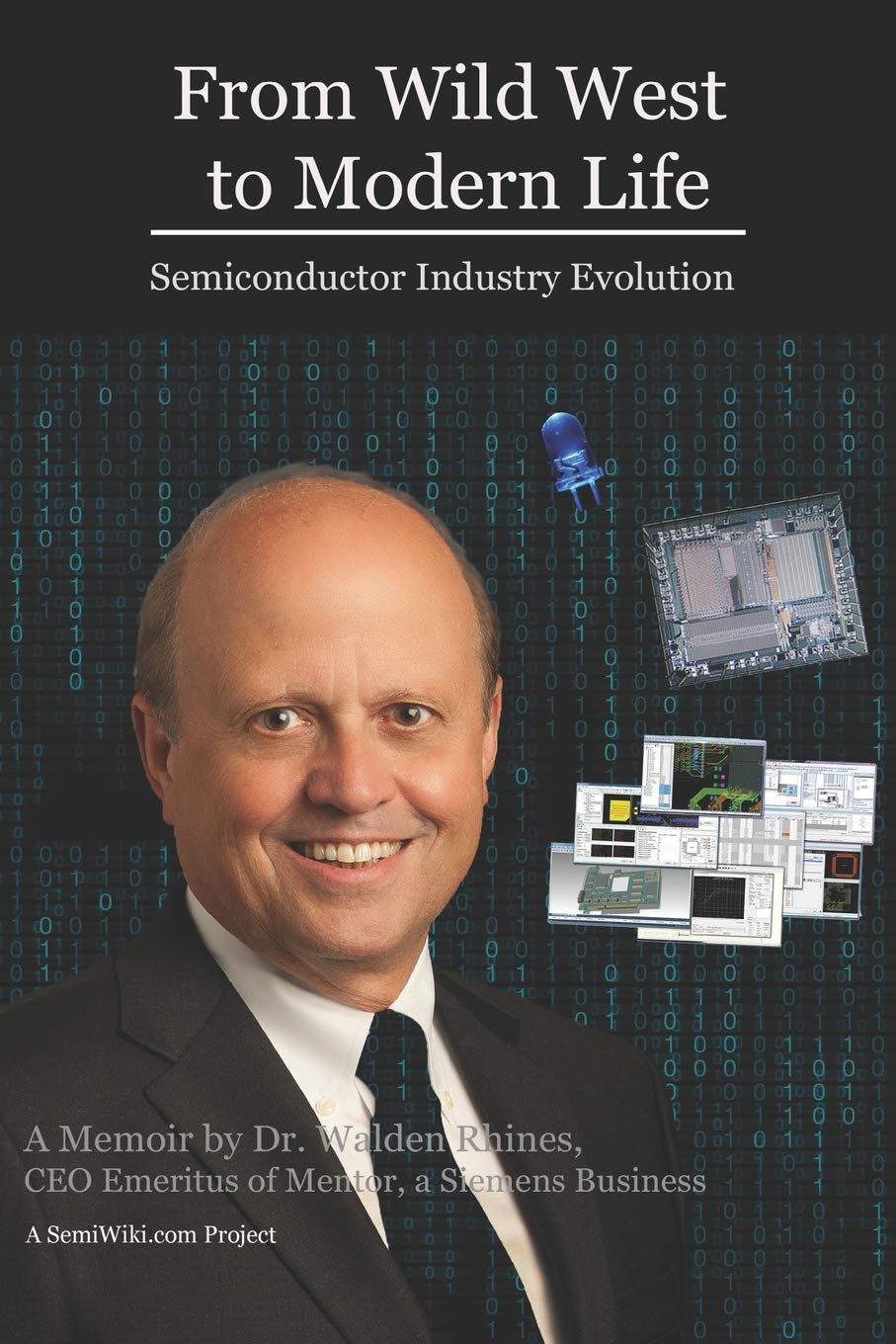
Cover of Wally Rhines' 2019 memoir.

- 2021: Morris Chang Exemplary Leadership Award, top award issued by the Global Semiconductor Alliance (GSA)
- 2020: Semiconductor Industry Hall of Fame, VLSI Research
- 2019: ChipEx Global Industry Leader (issued by ChipEx Selection Committee - Leading Annual Conference of Israeli Semiconductor Industry)
- 2019: Sarabhai Award (Lifetime Achievement Award), India Electronics and Semiconductor Association
- 2017: IEEE Fellow
- 2016: honorary doctor of technology degree from University of Florida
- 2015: Phil Kaufman Award for his contributions to the EDA and IC design industries.
- 2014: Distinguished Eagle Scout Award (he became an Eagle Scout in 1964).
- 2009: International Engineering Consortium distinguished fellow award
- 2003: University of Michigan Alumni Society Merit Award in 2003
- 2002: Semico Research Bellwether Award
- 1998: honorary doctor of technology degree from Nottingham Trent University
- 1970: U.S. Army Legion of Valor of the United States Bronze Cross for Achievement

== Noted publications ==
- Rhines, Walden (22 June 2017). "The Texas Instruments 99/4: World's First 16-Bit Home Computer". Spectrum. IEEE.
- Rhines, Walden (22 June 2017). "The Inside Story of Texas Instruments' Biggest Blunder: The TMS9900 Microprocessor". Spectrum. IEEE.
- Maruska, Herbert Paul; Rhines, Walden Clark (September 2015). "A modern perspective on the history of semiconductor nitride blue light sources". Solid-State Electronics. 111 (2015): 32–41. Bibcode:2015SSEle.111...32M. doi:10.1016/j.sse.2015.04.010.
- Rhines, Walden C. (14 October 2014). "Nobels Should Celebrate Invention and Optimization". EE Times. UBM Tech.
- Rhines, W.C. (2006). "Sociology of Design and EDA". IEEE Design & Test of Computers. 23 (4): 304–310. doi:10.1109/MDT.2006.103. S2CID 206459089.
- Rhines, W.C. (2005). "Moore's law is unconstitutional". Proceedings of the 18th International Conference on VLSA Design. IEEE. pp. 31–32. doi:10.1109/ICVD.2005.121.
- Rhines, W.C. (2003). "Part VII: Designers Face Critical Challenges and Discontinuities in Analog/Mixed Signal Design and Physical Verification". In Kuehlmann, Andreas (ed.). The best of ICCAD : 20 years of excellence in computer-aided design. Boston [u.a.]: Kluwer Academic Publ. pp. 659–662. ISBN 978-1-4020-7391-5.

== Books ==
- Rhines, Dr. Walden (2020). Predicting Semiconductor Business Trends After Moore's Law. ISBN 978-1674536026.
- Rhines, Dr. Walden (2019). From Wild West to Modern Life: Semiconductor Industry Evolution. ISBN 978-1095793169.

Rhines also is listed as a source in books about the evolving semiconductor industry.

- Nenni, Daniel (2014). Fabless: The Transformation of the Semiconductor Industry. ISBN 978-1497525047.
- Moore, James F. (2013). Shared Purpose: A thousand business ecosystems, a connected community, and the future. ISBN 978-1490502397.
