= Rob A. Rutenbar =

American academic

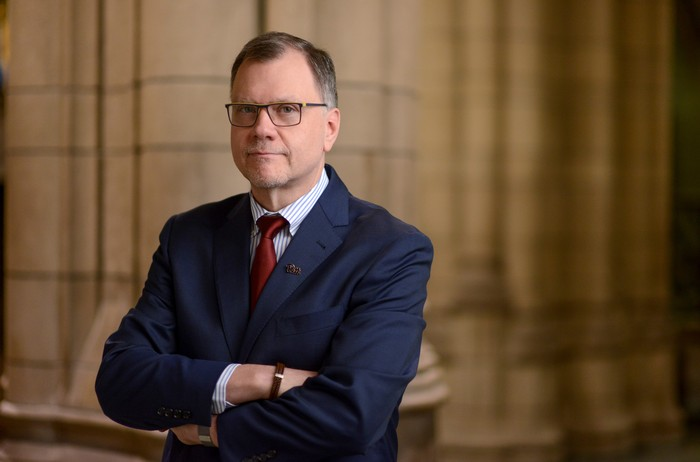
- Born: November 19, 1957 (age 68)
- Education: University of Michigan
- Awards: ACM Fellow, IEEE Fellow, NAI Fellow, AAAS Fellow, ACM SIGDA Pioneering Achievement Award (2021), ESD-IEEE CEDA Phil Kaufman Award (2017), Donald O. Pedersen Best Paper Award (2011 and 2013), IEEE CAS Industrial Pioneer Award, SRC Aristotle Award, University of Michigan Alumni Merit Award (Electrical Engineering)
- Scientific career
- Fields: Computer science, computer engineering
- Workplaces: University of Pittsburgh; University of Illinois Urbana–Champaign; Carnegie Mellon University
- Doctoral advisor: Daniel E. Atkins III

Rob A. Rutenbar (born November 19, 1957) is an American academic noted for contributions to software tools that automate analog integrated circuit design, and custom hardware platforms for high-performance automatic speech recognition. He is Senior Vice Chancellor for Research at the University of Pittsburgh, where he leads the university's strategic and operational vision for research and innovation.

== Biography ==
Rutenbar received M.S. and Ph.D. degrees in computer engineering from the University of Michigan, Ann Arbor, in 1979 and 1984, respectively. He joined the department of Electrical and Computer Engineering at Carnegie Mellon University (CMU) in 1984. At CMU, his research group developed a wide range of novel CAD tools to optimize, synthesize, and perform geometric layout on analog and mixed-signal integrated circuits. In 1998, he cofounded Neolinear, Inc. to commercialize these tools. He served as Neolinear’s Chief Scientist until its acquisition by Cadence Design Systems in 2004. In 2001, he was the founding director of a large, multi-university research center – the Center for Circuit & Systems Solutions (C2S2) -- funded by the US semiconductor industry and US Defense Advanced Projects Research Agency (DARPA) to address challenges arising from the end of Moore’s Law scaling. He served as Director of C2S2 from 2001 to 2009. Also while at CMU, his In Silico Vox project developed novel hardware platforms for very fast, energy efficient speech recognition. In 2006, he cofounded the Silicon Vox Corporation to commercialize these ideas. The company was renamed Voci Technologies in 2010, and it focuses on high-performance solutions for enterprise-scale voice analytics.

In 2010, he left CMU to become Head of the Department of Computer Science at the University of Illinois Urbana–Champaign. At CMU, and continuing at Illinois, he led some of the first work to apply data mining and machine learning techniques for electronic design automation. In 2013, he launched a Massive Open Online Course (MOOC) on VLSI CAD, to over 17,000 registered participants. In 2016, this evolved into a set of related CAD MOOCs, which has reached over 50,000 learners worldwide.

In 2017, he joined the University of Pittsburgh in the newly established position of Senior Vice Chancellor for Research. He also holds faculty appointments in the School of Computing and Information and in the Swanson School of Engineering. Rutenbar serves on boards for several entrepreneurial and cultural organizations in Pittsburgh, including LifeX, Innovation Works, and the Carnegie Science Center.

== Education and service contributions ==
As several massive open online course (MOOC) providers emerged in 2012, Rutenbar led the University of Illinois Urbana–Champaign to establish a relationship with Coursera. Subsequently, the University become the first land-grant institution to enter a Coursera partnership. Under Rutenbar’s leadership, the Department of Computer Science launched a MOOC-based professional masters of computer science in data science (MCS-DS) in fall 2016.

In 2014, Rutenbar led the launch of a large program of novel, cooperative B.S. degrees at Illinois called “CS+X” (a term originally coined by Alfred Spector, a former colleague of Rutenbar's at CMU) that integrate computing and “X” disciplinary topics, ranging from anthropology to astronomy, music, and agriculture.

Illinois Computer Science was recognized in 2017 with the Grand Prize for the NCWIT Extension Services Transformation (NEXT) Award for showing “significant positive outcomes in increasing women’s meaningful participation in computing education” during Rutenbar’s tenure.

Rutenbar has co-chaired the National Science Foundation Computer and Information Science and Engineering Advisory Committee’s Data Science Working Group, and he served on the National Academies of Sciences Committee on Envisioning the Data Sciences Discipline: The Undergraduate Perspective. His PhD students include Ramesh Harjani (E.F Johnson Professor of ECE at U. Minnesota) and John Cohn.

== Awards and honors ==
Rutenbar is a Fellow of the IEEE and the ACM. He received the 2001 Aristotle Award from the Semiconductor Research Corporation, acknowledging his mentoring and the impact of his students on the US semiconductor industry. He was awarded the Stephen J. Jatras (E’47) Chair in ECE by Carnegie Mellon University in 2001. He was honored with the University of Michigan Alumni Merit Award (Electrical Engineering) in 2002. He was awarded the IEEE CAS Industrial Pioneer Award in 2007, for “pioneering contributions” to tools for custom circuit synthesis, and their successful commercialization. In 2008, he was inducted into the College of Engineering's Alumni Hall of Fame at Wayne State University. He was awarded the Abel Bliss Professorship in Engineering from the University of Illinois Urbana–Champaign in 2010. He is a two-time winner of the IEEE Transactions on Computer-Aided Design Donald O. Pedersen Best Paper Award, in 2011 and again in 2013, for work on statistical analysis for nanoscale silicon. He has also been recognized with the 2017 Phil Kaufman Award for "his pioneering contributions to algorithms and tools for analog and mixed-signal designs" by the Electronic System Design Alliance and the IEEE Council on Electronic Design Automation (CEDA). In 2019, Rutenbar was elected a fellow of the National Academy of Inventors. In 2021, he won the ACM SIGDA Pioneering Achievement Award, “for his pioneering work and extraordinary leadership in analog design automation and general EDA education”.
