= IEEE Gustav Robert Kirchhoff Award =

- Awarded for: To honor teachers of electrical and electronics engineering and the related disciplines.
- Presented by: IEEE
- Rewards: The award consists of a bronze medal, certificate, and honorarium.
- First award: 2003
- Website: IEEE Gustav Robert Kirchhoff Award

The IEEE Gustav Robert Kirchhoff Award is a Technical Field Award established by the IEEE Board of Directors in 2003. This award is presented for outstanding contributions to the fundamentals of any aspect of electronic circuits and systems that has a long-term significance or impact.

The award may be presented to an individual or multiple recipients where all members of the group could be judged to have made a crucial contribution(s) to the overall outcome.

Recipients of this award receive a bronze medal, certificate, and honorarium.

== Recipients ==
- 2027: Janusz Rajski
- 2026: David J. Allstot
- 2025: Giovanni De Micheli
- 2024: Mary Jane Irwin
- 2023: Yoshisuke Ueda
- 2022: Joos Vandewalle
- 2021: Thomas Lee
- 2020: Martin Hasler
- 2019: Kenneth W. Martin
- 2018: Alan N. Willson Jr.
- 2017: Marcel Pelgrom
- 2016: P. P. Vaidyanathan
- 2015: Yosiro Oono
- 2014: Chung Laung Liu
- 2013: Sanjit Kumar Mitra
- 2012: Ronald A. Rohrer
- 2011: Charles A. Desoer
- 2010: Hitoshi Watanabe
- 2009: Ernest S. Kuh
- 2008: Alfred Fettweis
- 2007: Yannis P. Tsividis
- 2006: Gabor Temes
- 2005: Leon O. Chua
