= Gattiker =

Gattiker is a surname. Notable people with the surname include:

- Alejandro Gattiker (born 1958), Argentine tennis player, brother of Carlos
- Anne Gattiker, American electrical engineer
- Carlos Gattiker (1956–2010), Argentine tennis player, brother of Alejandro
