= TCAD =

TCAD may stand for one of the following:

- TCAD (Borland), a component of Borland Delphi and C++ Builder to facilitate writing vector graphics applications
- Technology CAD, computer-aided design for semiconductor process technology and semiconductor device design
- Traffic collision avoidance device
- Tricyclic antidepressants, a class of medications which block serotonin and norepinephrine reuptake in the brain.
