= Anne Gattiker =

American electrical engineer

Anne E. Gattiker is an American electrical engineer who works for IBM in Austin, Texas, focusing on testing and variability of integrated circuits.

Gattiker is the daughter of Godfrey L. Gattiker, a scholar of Old English and Middle English at Wilson College (Pennsylvania). She has a master's degree and Ph.D. from Carnegie Mellon University; she completed her Ph.D. in 1998 through the university's Center for Silicon System Implementation.

Gattiker was a recipient of the 2008 Mahboob Khan Outstanding Mentor Award of the Semiconductor Research Corporation, given for her work mentoring interns from Carnegie Mellon University. She was named as an IEEE Fellow in 2019, "for contributions to integrated circuit test and diagnosis".
