= Chung Laung Liu =

Taiwanese computer scientist (1934–2020)

Liu Chung Laung
- 劉炯朗
- Born: 1934; Guangzhou, Guangdong, China
- Died: 7 November 2020 (aged 85–86); Taipei, Taiwan
- Education: National Cheng Kung University (BS); Massachusetts Institute of Technology (BE, MS, DSc)
- Awards: Member of Academia Sinica
- Scientific career
- Fields: Computer science
- Institutions: Massachusetts Institute of Technology (1962–1972); University of Illinois at Urbana-Champaign (1972–1998); National Tsing Hua University (1998–2002); City University of Hong Kong; National Cheng Kung University (2007–2020)
- Thesis: Some memory aspects of finite automata (1962)
- Doctoral advisor: Dean Norman Arden; David A. Huffman
- Doctoral students: Andrew Yao

Liu Chung Laung (Chinese: 劉炯朗; pinyin: Liú Jiǒnglǎng; 1934 – 7 November 2020), also known as David Liu or C. L. Liu, was a Taiwanese computer scientist. He was a professor of computer science at National Tsing Hua University, and was previously a professor at the Massachusetts Institute of Technology (MIT) and the University of Illinois Urbana-Champaign.

== Early life and education ==
Liu was born in Guangzhou, China, in 1934 and moved with his family to Macau in 1937 after the outbreak of the Second Sino-Japanese War. He had two brothers; his older brother became an aeronautical engineer and his younger brother became a chemical engineer. Their father, Liu Peiran, was a pilot in the National Revolutionary Army. In Macau, Liu attended primary school and high school, and became fluent in Cantonese.

After graduating from high school in Macau in 1952, Liu went to Taiwan and enrolled at National Cheng Kung University, where he studied physics and calculus. He graduated from Cheng Kung with a Bachelor of Science (B.S.) in 1956 and completed two years of military service in the Republic of China Armed Forces. After graduation, he won a scholarship to pursue graduate studies in the United States at the Massachusetts Institute of Technology (MIT), where he earned a Bachelor of Electrical Engineering (B.E.E.) and a Master of Science (M.S.) in electrical engineering, both in 1960. Liu wrote his M.S. thesis, "A study in machine-aided learning," under engineering professor Ronald A. Howard.

In 1962, after only two years of study, Liu completed his Doctor of Science (D.Sc.) in electrical engineering at MIT under professors Dean N. Arden and David A. Huffman. As a graduate student, he worked part-time as a research assistant and took a class with Claude Shannon. His doctoral dissertation was titled, "Some memory aspects of finite automata".

== Career ==
He was on the faculty of the Massachusetts Institute of Technology (1962–1972) and the University of Illinois at Urbana-Champaign (1972–1998), where he was Associate Provost from 1995 to 1998. He then retired from UIUC and served as President and Professor of Computer Science at the National Tsing Hua University (NTHU) in Hsinchu, Taiwan from February 1998 to February 2002. He was the William Mong Honorary Chair Professor at National Tsing Hua University. He was a visiting professor at City University of Hong Kong, and at Waseda University, Tokyo, Japan, and Li K. T. Honorary Chair Professor at National Central University. Since 2007 he was Li Kuo-Ting Forum Professor at National Cheng Kung University.

He was the author and co-author of seven books and monographs, and over 180 technical papers. His research interests included computer-aided design of VLSI circuits, real-time systems, computer-aided instruction, combinatorial optimization, and discrete mathematics.

== Awards and honors ==
He received the IEEE Millennium Medal, and the IEEE Circuits and Systems Society Golden Jubilee Medal in 2000. He also received the IEEE Computer Society, Real Time Systems Technical Committee 1999 Technical Achievement Award (inaugural winner) for his contributions in the area of real time scheduling, and the IEEE Circuits and Systems Society 1998 Technical Achievement Award for his contributions in the area of computer aided design of VLSI circuits. He received an Outstanding Talents Foundation Award in 1998. He was the recipient of the 1994 IEEE Education Medal. He also received the Taylor L. Booth Education Award from the IEEE Computer Society in 1992, and the inaugural winner of the Karl V. Karlstrom Education Award from the Association for Computing Machinery in 1989.

He was a member of Academia Sinica (elected 2000), a fellow of the Institute of Electrical and Electronics Engineers, and a fellow of the Association for Computing Machinery.

In 2004, the University of Macau awarded him an honorary doctorate.

Liu was married to Jane Liu, also a distinguished computer scientist and known for her work in real-time computing. He died on 7 November 2020, aged 86, in Taipei.

== Awards ==
- 2016: ACM SIGDA Pioneering Achievement Award
- 2014: IEEE Gustav Robert Kirchhoff Award
- 2011: Phil Kaufman Award, for technical and business contributions in Electronic design automation.
- 2000: The Institute of Electrical and Electronics Engineers (IEEE) Millennium Medal, and the IEEE Circuits and Systems Society Golden Jubilee Medal
- 1999: The IEEE Computer Society, Real Time Systems Technical Committee 1999 Technical Achievement Award (inaugural winner) for his contributions in the area of real time scheduling,
- 1999: The IEEE Circuits and Systems Society 1998 Technical Achievement Award for his contributions in the area of computer aided design of VLSI circuits.
- 1998: Outstanding Talents Foundation Award
- 1994: IEEE Education Medal and ACM Fellow.
- 1992: The Taylor L. Booth Education Award from the IEEE Computer Society
- 1989: Karl V. Karlstrom Outstanding Educator Award from the Association for Computing Machinery

Academic offices
Preceded by Chen Hsin-hsiung	President of National Tsing Hua University; 1998-2002	Succeeded by Frank Shu
