= Lip-Bu Tan =

CEO of Intel (born 1959)

- 陳立武
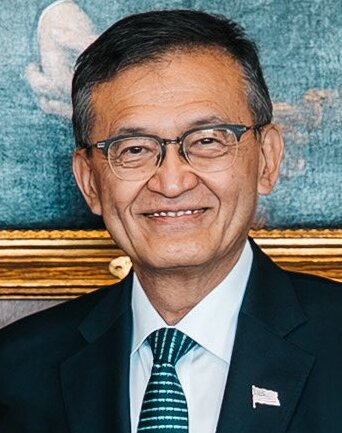
- Tan in 2025
- Born: November 12, 1959 (age 67); Muar, Federation of Malaya
- Citizenship: United States
- Education: Nanyang University (BS); Massachusetts Institute of Technology (MS); University of San Francisco (MBA)
- Occupation: Business executive
- Title: CEO of Intel (2025–present); CEO of Cadence Design Systems (2009–2021)
- Predecessor: Pat Gelsinger
- Spouse: Ysa Loo
- Children: 2

Chinese name
- Traditional Chinese: 陳立武
- Simplified Chinese: 陈立武
- Hanyu Pinyin: Chén Lìwǔ
- Hokkien POJ: Tân Li̍p-bú
- Website: newsroom.intel.com

Lip-Bu Tan (Note: Chinese: 陳立武; pinyin: Chén Lìwǔ; Pe̍h-ōe-jī: Tân Li̍p-Bú) (born November 12, 1959) is an American business executive who has been chief executive officer (CEO) of Intel since 2025. He is also chairman of Walden International, a venture capital firm; a founding managing partner of Walden Catalyst Ventures and Celesta Capital; and holds numerous board positions. Tan was CEO of Cadence Design Systems from 2009 to 2021.

== Early life and education ==
Tan was born November 12, 1959, in Muar, Johor, Federation of Malaya (modern-day Malaysia), to an ethnic Malayan Chinese family. His father, Keng Lian Tan, was the chief editor of the Malaysian Chinese-language daily newspaper Nanyang Siang Pau, and his mother, Yeok Choong Chew, was a university warden at Nanyang University. He is the youngest of five siblings.

Tan received a Bachelor of Science degree in physics from Nanyang University in 1978, a Master of Science degree in nuclear engineering from the Massachusetts Institute of Technology in 1980, and a Master of Business Administration degree from the University of San Francisco in 1983.

He received an honorary Doctor of Humane Letters degree from the University of San Francisco in 2022 and an honorary Doctor of Science and Technology degree from Carnegie Mellon University in Pittsburgh in 2025.

== Career ==
=== Walden International ===
Tan was a manager at EDS Nuclear and ECHO Energy and partner at the Walden USA investment fund before founding venture capital (VC) firm Walden International in 1987. He named the firm after the book Walden by Henry David Thoreau because Tan's goal was to be like Thoreau: "Contrarian, rather than just following the trend."

The company grew from $3 million upon its founding to $5 billion by 2001 by focusing its investments in Asian tech startups. In 2001, Forbes dubbed Tan "the pioneer of Asian VC." Tan has focused on global technology investments primarily in semiconductors, artificial intelligence (AI), and software. He has helped to create more than 300 American companies, approximately 50,000 American jobs, and $400 billion in American market capitalization. He worked with 40 American companies through the initial public offering (IPO) on the U.S. stock exchanges (Nasdaq/NYSE). Additionally, Tan assisted 66 companies with a mergers & acquisitions exit.

=== Cadence Design Systems ===
In February 2004, Cadence Design Systems' board of directors elected Tan to the board. Tan became interim co-CEO of Cadence in October 2008. The Cadence board formally named Tan president and CEO effective January 2009. Under Tan's leadership, Cadence revenue doubled and generated approximately 4,000% return for shareholders. Tan recruited and trained his successor and stepped down as CEO and became executive chairman in 2021. He later stepped down from the office of chairman of Cadence in 2023.

=== Intel ===
In March 2025, Tan was named CEO of Intel, effective from March 18, 2025. Tan had been on Intel's board of directors from 2022 to 2024.

When Tan took over as CEO, he began developing a turnaround strategy focused on restructuring Intel’s manufacturing operations, reducing management layers, and revising its artificial intelligence strategy. He also sought to improve competitiveness of Intel’s foundry business by attracting more external customers for its chip-manufacturing processes.

Tan said in July 2025 that Intel planned to reduce its workforce by approximately 15%, with a target of about 75,000 employees by the end of the year. He also said the company had reduced its management layers by about half during the second quarter. Intel described the measures as part of an effort to reduce costs, streamline decision-making, and increase organizational efficiency.

In July 2025, Intel said it would not proceed with previously planned projects in Germany and Poland, would consolidate assembly and testing operations in Costa Rica into larger sites in Vietnam and Malaysia, and would further slow construction of its Ohio manufacturing project. Tan said future factory investment would be more closely tied to customer demand and confirmed commitments.

Reuters reported in April 2025 that investment firms associated with Tan held stakes in more than 600 Chinese companies, including some with reported links to entities involved in military or surveillance activities. In August, President Donald Trump publicly called for Tan’s resignation, citing concerns about his connections to China. Tan’s investment history became a subject of public scrutiny in discussions about national security and potential conflicts of interest.

Following President Trump’s public call for his resignation in August 2025, Tan arranged a meeting with Trump at the White House that led to an agreement for the U.S. government to acquire an approximately 9.9% stake in Intel. Announced later that month, the $8.9 billion investment comprised $5.7 billion in previously awarded but unpaid CHIPS Act grants and $3.2 billion associated with the Secure Enclave program. The government would receive no seat on Intel’s board.

Tan’s longstanding relationships with the semiconductor industry helped Intel secure a $5 billion investment from Nvidia. Announced in September 2025, the investment accompanied a partnership to develop products combining Intel’s central processing units with Nvidia’s graphics-processing and AI technology. The agreement formed part of Tan’s effort to revive Intel’s business and leverage his industry relationships.

Tan’s personal investments and venture-capital relationships became a governance issue at Intel after he became CEO in March 2025. In summer 2025, he proposed that Intel acquire Rivos, an AI-chip startup where he was chairman and a shareholder, but the board initially rejected the proposal because of potential conflicts of interest and concerns about Intel’s AI strategy. Intel later made an offer after Meta showed interest in Rivos. Tan also proposed that Intel acquire SambaNova, where he served as executive chairman. After becoming CEO, Tan took direct control of Intel Capital, which subsequently invested in companies in which he held interests through his investment firms. Intel adopted rules requiring Tan to recuse himself from investment decisions in which he might benefit personally.

== Board memberships ==
=== Academic boards ===
Tan is currently on the board of UC Berkeley College of Engineering. He also is on the board of trustees of Carnegie Mellon University School of Engineering of which he is a member of the Dean's Advocacy Council, and established the Tan Endowed Graduate Fellowship for the Department of Electrical and Computer Engineering.

Tan is also a trustee at the Fuller Theological Seminary, where he was a founding member of the Insight Council, and received the Imec 2023 Lifetime of Innovation Award for his contributions to the chip industry and the entrepreneurship in the tech industry.

=== Company boards ===
Tan is on the boards of Intel, Schneider Electric, and Credo Technology Group. He was on the boards of Hewlett Packard Enterprise, Softbank Capital, Ambarella, Flextronics International, Inphi Corporation, Mindtree, Semiconductor Manufacturing International Corporation, and the United Overseas Bank.

Tan is a member of The Business Council. He is also a member of the Committee of 100.

== Philanthropy ==
In November 2019, Tan and Cadence Design Systems endowed two computer science professorships for $3 million each at Carnegie Mellon University in Pittsburgh, Pennsylvania, United States. In June 2024, Tan donated S$3 million to Nanyang Technological University (NTU) to set up a new professorship in artificial intelligence (AI), to attract talent and support the advancement of research and education at NTU's College of Computing and Data Science.

== Recognition ==
Tan was named to "The 100 Most Influential People of 2026" by Time magazine.

He was also honored with the 2025 Phil Kaufman Award for his leadership and impact on the Electronic System Design (ESD) industry.

In August 2022, Tan received the Robert N. Noyce Award from the Semiconductor Industry Association (SIA), the industry's highest honor.

In 2017, the analytics firm Relationship Science named Tan to the Most Connected Executives in the Technology Industry list with a perfect "power score" of 100.

== Personal life ==
Tan is an American citizen and lives in Piedmont, California, with his wife Ysa Loo. They have two grown children. A Christian, he adheres to Presbyterianism. Tan has been an elder at the First Presbyterian Church of Berkeley since the 1990s.

== Notes ==
Business positions
Preceded by Pat Gelsinger	CEO, Intel; 2025-present	Succeeded by Incumbent
