= David J. Allstot =

American academic

- Born: January 22, 1947 (age 79); Brookings, South Dakota

David J. Allstot (born January 22, 1947, in Brookings, South Dakota), is a professor of electrical and computer engineering at Carnegie Mellon University. His research includes work on analog, mixed-signal, and radio frequency integrated circuits. He was formerly a professor at UC Berkeley and the University of Washington.

Dr. Allstot was elected to serve as president of the IEEE Circuits and Systems Society in 2009, and was for that reason president-elect in 2008.

Dr. Allstot was elected as a member into the National Academy of Engineering in 2020 for his research and commercialization of mixed-mode integrated circuits and systems.

== Awards and honors ==
Allstot received several awards and honors, including:

- In 1980, the IEEE W.R.G. Baker Award (with Paul R. Gray, Gordon M. Jacobs, and Robert W. Brodersen), for the paper "Design Techniques for MOS Switched Capacitor Ladder Filters", in the IEEE Transactions on Circuits and Systems, December 1978
- In 1992, Fellow of the Institute of Electrical and Electronics Engineers (IEEE)
- In 1995 and 2010, the Darlington Best Paper Award from the IEEE Circuits and Systems Society
- In 2020, elected to National Academy of Engineering
- In 2026, the IEEE Gustav Robert Kirchhoff Award, "for contributions to CMOS mixed-signal-RF ICs and mentoring generations of circuits and systems designers"
