= Crosslight Software =

Software company in Canada

Crosslight Software, Inc.
- Type: Private
- Industry: Semiconductor device
- Founded: 1995
- Headquarters: Vancouver, British Columbia, Canada
- Key people: Dr. Simon Li, Founder & CEO
- Products: Technology CAD
- Website: www.crosslight.com

Crosslight Software Inc. is an international company headquartered in greater Vancouver, British Columbia, Canada. Officially spun off from the National Research Council of Canada (NRC) in 1995, it provides Technology Computer Aided Design (TCAD) tools for semiconductor device and process simulations.

Crosslight's founder, Dr. Z.M. Simon Li (李湛明), is a pioneer in the field of optoelectronic device simulation TCAD and based on this work, Crosslight claims to be the first commercial vendor of TCAD tools for quantum well laser diodes. Crosslight also licenses other technology from the Stanford University TCAD Group for semiconductor process simulations.

== History ==
After its initial spin-off from the NRC, Crosslight launched its flagship product LASTIP, a 2D simulator for quantum well laser diodes. Based on its founder's research, LASTIP predates other well-known tools in the field such as MINILASE. By adding the ability to model quantum well active regions, LASTIP was also a significant step-up from earlier comparable efforts such as Hitachi's HILADIES. As early laser diode TCAD tools were primarily developed by individual researchers for their own use, Crosslight claims that LASTIP's commercialization makes them first-to-market in this field.

Further improvements in the technology followed including the development of PICS3D for 3D modeling of optoelectronic devices, a feat which earned Crosslight the Laser Focus World Commercial Technology Achievement Award in 1998. For non-laser TCAD applications such as solar cells and light-emitting diodes, a third tool called APSYS was developed.

In March 2004, Crosslight licensed the legendary 2D process simulator SUPREM-IV.GS from Stanford University and extended it to 3D as the core of its process simulation tool CSUPREM.

In January 2010, Crosslight entered into a partnership with Acceleware with the intention of producing greater speed in thin film solar cell and image pixel sensor simulations.

Since its founding, Crosslight has built up a worldwide base of industrial and academic users and has sponsored research and academic projects at various universities and research institutes. It has also collaborated with many leading researchers in the field of semiconductor devices, including Nobel-prize winner Shuji Nakamura.

== Products ==
=== LASTIP ===
Laser Technology Integrated Program is Crosslight's flagship product and was intended to bring to the laser diode community a level of maturity equivalent to that seen in the silicon IC industry. It includes optical gain models for quantum well/wire/dot with different types of spectral broadening, Coulomb interaction for many-body effects, k.p non-parabolic subbands and models optical mode competition in structures supporting multiple lateral modes.

=== PICS3D ===
Photonic Integrated Circuit Simulator in 3D, is a state of the art 3D-simulator for surface and edge emission laser diodes, SOA and other similar active waveguide devices. 2/3 dimensional semiconductor equations (drift-diffusion) are coupled to the optical modes in both the lateral and longitudinal directions. Optical properties such as quantum well/wire/dot optical gain and spontaneous emission rates are computed self-consistently.

=== APSYS ===
Advanced Physical Models of Semiconductor Devices, is based on 2D/3D finite element analysis of electrical, optical and thermal properties of compound semiconductor devices with an emphasis on band structure engineering and quantum mechanical effects. Unlike other TCAD tools used in the microelectronics industry, silicon is merely a special case of a more generalized semiconductor material library.

=== CSUPREM ===
(Crosslight-SUPREM) is a 3D process simulation software package based on the SUPREM.IV.GS code developed at the Integrated Circuits Laboratory of Stanford University.

=== PROCOM ===
(PROcesses of COMpounds) is a 2/3-dimensional process simulation software package for compound semiconductor growth by Metal-Organic Chemical Vapor Deposition (MOCVD). Given the deposition reactor geometry, chemical species and growth condition parameters, PROCOM predicts the semiconductor film growth rate, composition, thickness uniformity, dopant incorporation and defect distribution based on detailed chemical kinetics and mass/heat transfer models.
