= P. P. Vaidyanathan =

Indian American academic (born 1954)

- Education: University of California, Santa Barbara (PhD); Science College, University of Calcutta (BTech, MTech)
- Scientific career
- Fields: Digital signal processing
- Workplaces: California Institute of Technology (Caltech)
- Academic advisors: Sanjit K. Mitra

Palghat P. Vaidyanathan (born in Kolkata, India on 16 October 1954) is the Kiyo and Eiko Tomiyasu Professor of Electrical Engineering at the California Institute of Technology, Pasadena, California, USA, where he teaches and leads research in the area of signal processing, especially digital signal processing (DSP), and its applications. He has authored five books, and authored or coauthored close to six hundred papers in various IEEE journals and conferences. Prof. Vaidyanathan received his B.Tech. and M.Tech. degrees from the Institute of Radiophysics and Electronics, Science College campus of University of Kolkata, and a Ph.D. degree in Electrical Engineering from University of California Santa Barbara in 1982.

Prof. Vaidyanathan's pioneering contributions include the development of the theory and structures for filter banks, especially perfect reconstruction and orthonormal filter banks, which find applications in data compression standards such as JPEG and MPEG, and in digital communications. One of his early contributions is the development of the theory of robust digital filter structures directly in discrete time without recourse to classical circuit theoretical models. He has also contributed widely in other areas of signal processing including image processing, genomic signal processing, sampling theory, optimal transceivers, radar signal processing, and sensor array processing. He has also explored the role of number theory in signal processing applications.

== Awards and honors ==
- IEEE Jack S. Kilby Signal Processing Medal, 2024
- Fellow of the Indian National Academy of Engineering, 2021
- EURASIP Athanasios Papoulis Award, 2021
- Member of the U.S. National Academy of Engineering.
- IEEE Signal Processing Society Award, 2016.
- Northrop Grumman prize for Excellence in Teaching at California Institute of Technology, 2016.
- IEEE Gustav Robert Kirchhoff Award, 2016.
- Education Award of the IEEE Signal Processing Society, 2011.
- Eliahu Jury Seminar Award, University of Miami, 2007.
- Technical Achievement Award of the IEEE Signal Processing Society, 2001.
- Golden jubilee medal, IEEE Circuits and Systems Society, 2000.
- Distinguished lecturer, IEEE Signal Processing Society, 1996–97.
- Awards for excellence in teaching, California Institute of Technology (multiple times).
- Best paper awards from IEEE Signal Processing Society (multiple times).
- F. E. Terman Award of the ASEE, sponsored by the Hewlett-Packard company, 1995.
- Fellow of the IEEE, 1991.
- Presidential Young Investigator Award, National Science Foundation, 1986.

== Books ==
1. P. P. Vaidyanathan, Multirate systems and filter banks, Prentice Hall, Englewood Cliffs, 1993.
2. P. P. Vaidyanathan, The Theory of Linear Prediction, Morgan & Claypool Publishers, 2008.
3. P. P. Vaidyanathan, S.-M Phoong, and Y.-P Lin, Signal Processing and Optimization for Transceiver Systems, Cambridge University Press, 2010.
4. Y.-P Lin, S.-M. Phoong, and P. P. Vaidyanathan, Filter bank transceivers for OFDM and DMT systems, Cambridge University Press, 2010.
5. P. P. Vaidyanathan, Signals, Systems, and Signal Processing, Cambridge University Press, 2024.
