= A. Richard Newton =

Australian-born American computer scientist

- Arthur Richard Newton (1951–2007)
- Born: 1 July 1951; Gardenvale, Australia
- Died: 2 January 2007 (aged 55); San Francisco, US
- Education: University of Melbourne (BSE, ME); University of California Berkeley
- Known for: Circuit design CAD
- Awards: Phil Kaufman Award
- Scientific career
- Fields: Electronic Engineer
- Workplaces: University of California, Berkeley
- Doctoral advisor: Donald O. Pederson

Arthur Richard Newton (Melbourne, Australia, 1 July 1951 – 2 January 2007) was the dean of the College of Engineering at the University of California, Berkeley.

== Career ==
Newton was educated at the University of Melbourne and received a BE in 1973 and MEng.Sci in 1975. He then went to Berkeley in 1975 to work on SPICE (Simulation Program with Integrated Circuit Emphasis), a program initially developed by Larry Nagel and Donald Pederson to analyse and design complex electronic circuitry with speed and accuracy. It is claimed that nearly all electronic integrated circuits have been designed using SPICE or a derivative since the 1980s.

Berkeley awarded Newton a PhD in 1978 and, unusually, an Engineering Faculty position as well. He was appointed assistant professor in 1978, associate professor in 1982 and full professor in the Department of Electrical Engineering and Computer Sciences in 1985. He chaired the department from 1999 to 2000, and was dean of the College of Engineering and the Roy W. Carlson Professor of Engineering from 2000 until his death.

Robert Birgeneau, Berkeley's Chancellor, described him as, "Dynamic and entrepreneurial, he understood the power of engineering and technology in entirely new ways, and he connected them to addressing society's toughest problems. The vibrancy of his thinking shaped my own ideas about what engineering is and what it can be. This [his death] is an enormous loss for those at UC Berkeley, for California, and indeed for the international engineering community."

== Personal ==
Newton was born in 1951 at Gardenvale, Victoria to Rodger and Bette Newton. He was married to Petra Michel, and had two daughters.

He died at 55 due to pancreatic cancer at the University of California, San Francisco Medical Center.

== Memorials ==
In February 2007, Berkeley established the Dean A. Richard Newton Memorial Professorship in his honor, funded by the EDA Consortium and other friends, colleagues and corporate partners. The professorship's intention is to advance the field of synthetic biology, an emerging area in which he took a deep interest.

Sutardja Dai Hall, the headquarters for CITRIS at UC Berkeley, officially opened and was dedicated on February 27, 2009. His first PhD student and Cadence co-founder, Kenneth Keller, donated the Richard Newton Room.

In July 2007, Microsoft announced an academic award program for new, innovative applications of information technology in the spirit of Newton's longtime ideal. He had been on the Microsoft Research Technical Advisory Board for many years.

The IEEE Council on Electronic Design Automation and the ACM Special Interest Group on Design Automation have jointly established the ACM/IEEE A. Richard Newton Technical Impact Award named in his honor. It is a yearly award which honors outstanding technical contributions in the field of automated electronic design and was first awarded in 2009.

The Design Automation Conference has established the A. Richard Newton Graduate Scholarship in his honour. It supports graduate research and study in design automation. It was first awarded in 2008.

The Anita Borg Institute for Women and Technology has established the A. Richard Newton Educator Award recognising teaching practices, techniques and innovative approaches which encourages girls and women to study engineering, science and mathematics. It recognises Newton's contribution to encouraging women in technology. It was first awarded in 2011.

== Awards and recognition ==
He was the 2003 recipient of the Phil Kaufman Award. The University of Melbourne awarded him an LLD in 2003. He was member of the National Academy of Engineering since 2004, and in 2006, was named to the American Academy of Arts and Sciences.
