= Walden International =

American venture capital firm

Pacven Walden Management Co., Ltd.
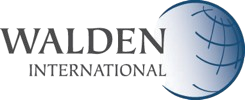
- Trade name: Walden International
- Type: Private
- Industry: Venture capital
- Predecessor: Walden Group
- Founded: 1987; 39 years ago
- Founders: Lip-Bu Tan; Peter Liu
- Headquarters: One California, San Francisco, California, U.S.
- Key people: Lip-Bu Tan (chairman)
- AUM: $5 billion (2024)
- Website: www.waldenintl.com.sg

Pacven Walden Management Co., Ltd. (doing business as Walden International) is an American venture capital firm based in San Francisco, California. It mainly focuses on investments in Asia and is one of the earliest venture capital firms to invest in the region.

The firm is known for playing a significant role in helping China's technology development.

== History ==
The origins of Walden International can be traced back to Walden Group (now known as Walden Venture Capital), one of the earliest San Francisco venture capital firms that was founded in 1974 by Art Berliner and George Sarlo. The firm's name comes from the book Walden by Henry David Thoreau which espoused challenging the status quo.

In 1983, when the U.S. venture capital market got overheated, the firm began exploring how to export the venture capital model overseas. During that year it hired Lip-Bu Tan to open up business in the Asian Market. Shortly after, Tan became a senior partner at the firm.

In 1987, in response to Li Kwoh-ting's invitation to invest in Taiwan, Tan and his colleague, Peter Liu founded Walden International as the Asian branch of Walden Group. Initial investors included development finance institutions, government agencies and local banks. It was able to raise capital for Taiwanese funds with relative ease from the network of Chinese Americans in Silicon Valley who were familiar with venture capital. The first two investments were in Northern California. Walden International helped Powerchip go public on the Taipei Exchange. Walden’s Chinese name, huádēng, translates roughly to ‘ascendant China. The Chinese name came from Tan's father hoping it would contribute to China's rise.

Singapore followed suit, offering tax incentives to attract Walden International. The firm invested in Creative Technology which listed on the Nasdaq in 1992.

In 1994, Walden Israel was founded as an affiliate of Walden International that would leverage its international connections.

In 1995, Liu left Walden International to focus on his own firm, WI Harper which used the branding of Walden.

By 2000, both Walden International and Walden Israel had been spun out from Walden Group to become independent. At the beginning, Walden International focused on computer peripherals and electronics but later expanded its scope to cover more areas of technology. In addition the firm expanded its coverage to include countries such as India, Japan and Malaysia. Some notable investments it had made at this point include Ariba, Check Point, Mindtree and Jobstreet.

By 2004, Walden International was significantly focused on the semiconductor industry. This differed from its peers who avoided semiconductors due to their long timeframes and risky technology. Investments included Inphi Corporation and Aptina.

In 2008, Walden Israel shut down due to fundraising issues.

In 2009, Tan became CEO of Cadence Design Systems but still remained chairman of Walden International. He had to balance duties between both of them. Many of the companies Walden International invested in were also customers of Cadence.

In November 2021, Walden International launched Walden Catalyst, a $550 million fund that will invest in early-stage deep tech companies in U.S., Europe and Israel.

=== Investments in China ===
In 1994, Walden International launched its first China focused fund. An early investment it made was in Mindray. The fund received $7.5 million from the World Bank.

It was the lead investor for Sina Corporation and helped structure the deal for it to become listed on the Nasdaq in 2000. This would become one of the most notable deals in the history of venture capital and set the stage for Walden International to gain access to the highest levels in the Chinese government.

In October 2017, Walden International and China Everbright Limited launched a $500 million Chinese semiconductor fund named Walden CEL Global Fund I.

According to the Rhodium Group, during the 2017-20 period, Walden International made 25 investments in Chinese chip companies accounting for more than 40% of the Chinese semiconductor deals involving U.S. venture investors during that period. It came third place in terms of number of China chip investments made since 2020 which was behind Sequoia China and Matrix Partners China.

In July 2023, the United States House Select Committee on Strategic Competition between the United States and the Chinese Communist Party notified several American venture capital firms that they were being investigated over their funding of Chinese tech companies. Walden International was included due to its investment in Semiconductor Manufacturing International Corporation (SMIC), China's largest chip maker. In February 2024, the committee released a report of its findings that stated five American venture capital firms (GGV Capital, GSR Ventures, Qualcomm Ventures, Sequoia Capital and Walden International) invested more than $1 billion in China's semiconductor industry since 2001, a sector considered a national security threat according to the U.S. government. Much of the report focused on Walden International which created various funds for the chip sector in partnership with the Chinese government and Chinese state-owned companies. Walden International gave $52 million to SMIC over several decades as well as tens of millions of dollars to SMIC affiliates such as Advanced Micro-Fabrication Equipment. Walden exited its investment in SMIC in January 2021.

According to Reuters in April 2025, Tan through Walden International and other investment partners had control over 40 Chinese companies as well as minority stakes in 600. This included China Electronics Corporation which is linked to the People's Liberation Army.
