= Jane Liu =

Chinese-American computer scientist

Jane Win-Shih Liu is a Chinese-American computer scientist known for her work on real-time computing. She is a professor emerita at the University of Illinois at Urbana–Champaign, Shun Hing Honorary Chair Professor of Computer Science at National Tsing Hua University, a distinguished visiting fellow of the Academia Sinica, and the former editor-in-chief of IEEE Transactions on Computers.

== Education and career ==
Liu majored in electrical engineering at Cleveland State University, and completed a doctorate at the Massachusetts Institute of Technology in 1968. Her dissertation, Reliability of Quantum Mechanical Communication Systems, was supervised by Robert Spayde Kennedy.

She was a member of the faculty at the University of Illinois at Urbana–Champaign from 1972 until her retirement in 2000. During this time, she was editor-in-chief of IEEE Transactions on Computers from 1996 to 1999. She worked for Microsoft from 2000 to 2004, when she joined the Academia Sinica.

== Books ==
Liu is the author of the book Real-Time Systems (Prentice-Hall, 2000), and co-author with C. L. Liu of Linear Systems Analysis (McGraw-Hill, 1975).

== Recognition ==
Liu was elected as an IEEE Fellow in 1995 "for contributions to real-time task scheduling methods for computing systems". The IEEE Technical Committee on Real-Time Systems gave her their Technical Achievement Award in 2005. In 2008, the Taiwan Institute of Information and Computing Machinery gave her their Information Science Honorary Medal.

== Personal life ==
Liu was married to Dave C.-L. Liu (1934–2020), with whom she founded and co-directed the Real Time and Embedded System Laboratory at the University of Illinois.
