= Acceleware =

Canadian software company

Acceleware Ltd.
- Type: Public (TSX-V: AXE)
- Industry: Oil Sands Technology
- Founded: 2004
- Headquarters: Calgary, Alberta, Canada
- Key people: Michal Okoniewski, Founder & CSO; Geoff Clark, CEO; Mike Tourigny, COO
- Products: Clean Tech Inverter, RF XL
- Revenue: CAD$740.09k (2021)
- Number of employees: 12 (Q4 2018)
- Website: https://www.acceleware.com

Acceleware Ltd. (TSX-V: AXE) is a Canadian oil and gas technology company with the subsidiaries Radio Frequency (RF) Enhanced Oil Recovery and Seismic Imaging Software. Acceleware produces seismic imaging for oil exploration in complex geologies.

Acceleware software can be used in the following industries: electromagnetics, oil and gas, medical imaging, security imaging, industrial product design, consumer product design, financial research, and academic research.

== History ==
Acceleware was founded in 2004, in Calgary, Alberta, Canada.

GPU Computing (using a graphics processing unit to compute mathematical algorithms), parallelizes complex tasks so that many equations may be calculated, at one time, as opposed to CPU computing which requires that these tasks be done in sequence. This parallelization results in a reduction of the time and costs required for highly complex and intensive simulations.

In January 2006, Acceleware went public on the TSX Venture Exchange (Symbol: AXE).

In January 2007, Nvidia invested $3 million in Accelware.

In January 2008, Acceleware entered into the seismic market, providing hardware acceleration for seismic migrations.

In 2010, Geoff Clark was appointed as CEO. Also in 2010, Acceleware partnered with Crosslight in January and with Paradigm in June.

In October 2018, Acceleware entered into an agreement with AMD to provide them with Software Engineering Expertise and Consulting Services.

In November 2019, Acceleware secured an investment from a Calgary-based oil sands producer for the RF XL pilot test of its radio frequency heating system.

During the COVID-19 pandemic, Acceleware participated in the Faster, Together campaign to increase acceptance of COVID-19 vaccines.
