= Ernest S. Kuh =

Chinese-born American electrical engineer (1928–2015)

Ernest Shiu-Jen Kuh (Chinese: 葛守仁; pinyin: Gě Shǒurén; Wade–Giles: Ko Shou-jen; 2 October 1928 – 27 June 2015) was a Chinese-born American electrical engineer. He served as Dean of the College of Engineering of the University of California, Berkeley.

== Biography ==
Kuh was born in Beijing on 2 October 1928 to Zone S. Keh and Tsai Chu. Kuh was the youngest son of six siblings; he also had a younger sister. His father was a Nationalist government official, and later worked for a bank. Ernest Kuh was raised in Shanghai and attended Nanyang Model High School before enrolling at Shanghai Jiao Tong University from 1945 to 1947 for electrical engineering.

In December 1947, Kuh escaped the Chinese Civil War, arriving in the United States, where he finished his bachelor's degree at the University of Michigan. He earned his master's degree from the Massachusetts Institute of Technology. Upon graduating from Stanford University with a doctorate in electrical engineering, Kuh worked for Bell Labs until 1956.

In 1956, he joined the faculty of the University of California, Berkeley on the recommendation of Donald Pederson, whom Kuh had met at Bell Labs. Kuh was named chair of the Department of Electrical Engineering and Computer Sciences in 1968, and appointed the dean of the College of Engineering in 1973. Later that year, Kuh returned to China for the first time since he left in 1947, and in his later career, repeatedly traveled to China, Japan, and Taiwan to enhance the teaching of electrical engineering. Kuh left his position as dean in 1980 and spent more time researching electronic design automation. In 1990, he was named the William S. Floyd Professor in Engineering.

== Personal life ==
Kuh was married to his wife Bettine for 58 years until his death. They had two sons, Anthony and Theodore, and three grandsons, Matthew, Jason and Evan. Kuh died on 27 June 2015 at the age of 86.
