= Ronald A. Rohrer =

American computer scientist

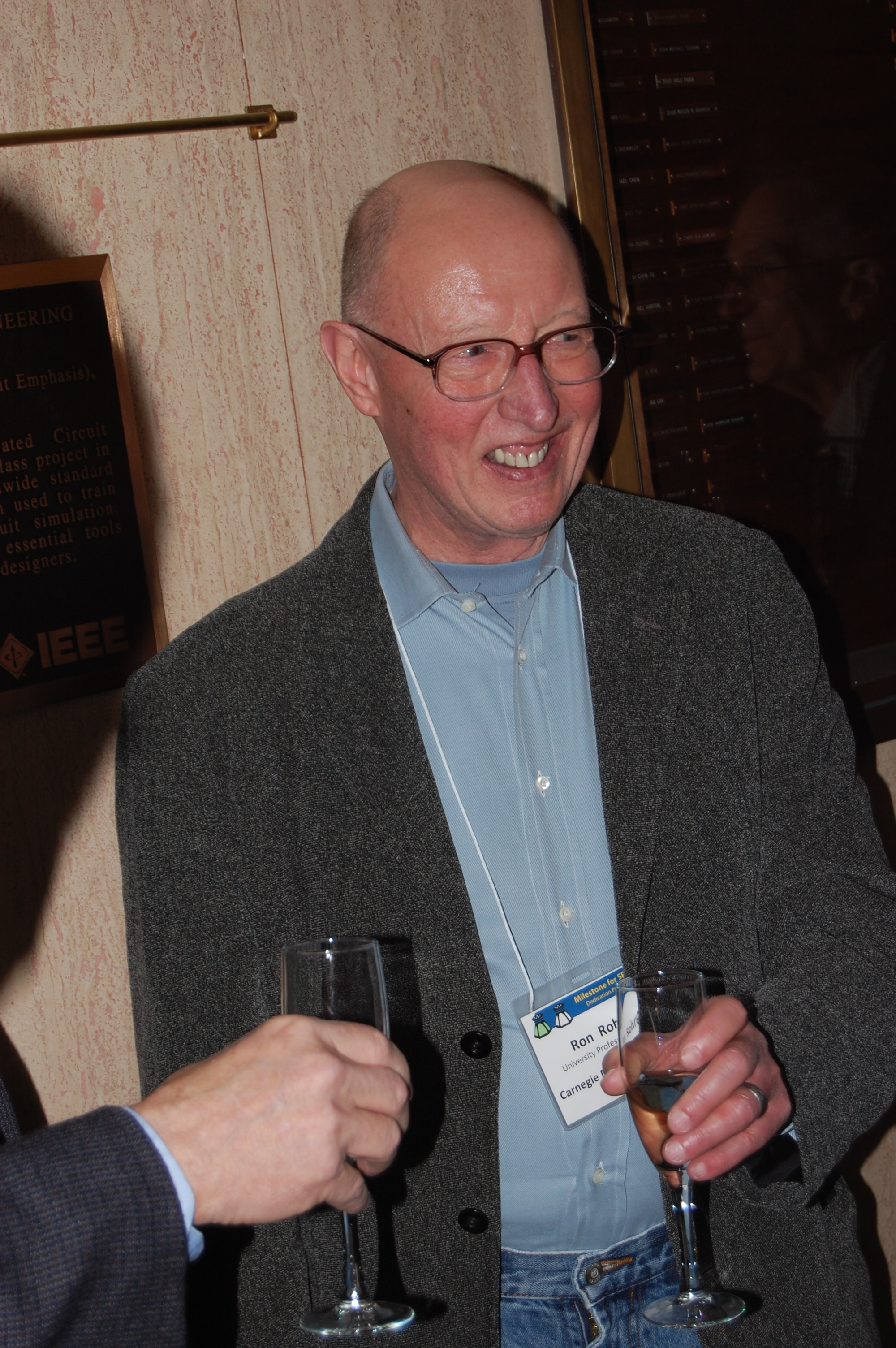
- Ronald A. Rohrer
- Born: 19 August 1939 (age 87)
- Education: UC Berkeley
- Occupation: University Professor
- Scientific career
- Fields: Computer Science, Electrical Engineering
- Workplaces: Southern Methodist University

Ronald Alan Rohrer (born 1939) is an American computer scientist and electric engineer. He is best known for being the inventor of the SPICE circuit simulator.

== Biography ==
He was born in 1939.

== Education ==
He received the B.S. degree from Massachusetts Institute of Technology in 1960.

He received his M.S. (1961) and Ph.D. (1963) degrees from the University of California (UC), Berkeley.

== Career ==
He has served as the professor emeritus of Electrical and Computer Engineering at Carnegie Mellon University.

He is currently the Cecil & Ida Green Chair Professor of Electrical and Computer Engineering at the Southern Methodist University.

=== Academic career ===
He has supervised the doctoral dissertations of three students at UC Berkeley: Edward Butler, Stephen Director and Richard Dowell.

== Awards and honours ==
He has won a number of awards and honours:

- Phil Kaufman Award
- IEEE Gustav Robert Kirchhoff Award

== See also ==
- Southern Methodist University
- Carnegie Mellon University
