= Philip A. Kaufman =

American engineer

Philip A. Kaufman (Phil Kaufman) (1942 – July 17, 1992) was an American engineer, the namesake of the Phil Kaufman Award, a prestigious award in the electronic design automation (EDA) industry.

He was president and CEO of Quickturn Systems, ex-chief of Silicon Compiler Systems. He died unexpectedly on his business trip to Japan in 1992.
