= Procom Technology =

American computer storage products manufacturer

Procom Technology, Inc.
- Type: Public
- Industry: Computer
- Founded: 1987; 39 years ago in Irvine, California
- Founders: Alex Razm'joo; Nick Shahrestany; Frank Alaghband; Alex Aydin
- Defunct: December 2006; 19 years ago
- Fate: Intellectual property acquired by Sun Microsystems in 2005; merged with CNDL Acquisition Corporation in 2006
- Products: Data storage
- Number of employees: 275 (2000)
- Website: procom.com (archived)

Procom Technology, Inc., was an American computer storage products manufacturer based in Orange County, California, and active from 1987 to 2005. The company initially produced a wide range of standalone magnetic and optical data storage products for the IBM PC and compatibles and the Macintosh before honing in on platform-agnostic network-attached storage (NAS) products. Toward the end of their existence, they were most well known for their CD Tower series of CD-based NAS devices. The company's intellectual property was acquired by Sun Microsystems in 2005 for $50 million.

== History ==
=== Foundation (1987–1992) ===
Procom Technology was founded by Alex Razm'joo, Nick Shahrestany, Frank Alaghband, and Alex Aydin, in Irvine, California, in 1987. All four founders were Iranian-born immigrants who had worked various computer industry jobs while studying at the University of California, Irvine. Both Razm'joo and Shahrestany previously worked for CMS Enhancements, another data storage product firm based in Irvine. The four founded Procom with $40,000 in start-up capital.

In August 1987, they released their first product, an external 5.25-inch floppy disk drive intended for use with IBM's new PS/2 line of personal computers, which replaced the IBM PC's 5.25-inch floppy disk format of choice with the new 3.5-inch floppy disk format, invented by Sony in 1982. The product was fairly successful, and by 1988 the company posted $2.5 million in annual revenue.

In the late 1980s, the company released a family of external hard drives that combined with software for the Macintosh and IBM PC and compatibles allowed data to be stored and transferred between them. The company's revenue reached $12 million in 1989 and $18 million in 1990. In 1991, the company employed 125 from its office in Irvine and posted sales of $28 million.

In 1992, the company moved its headquarters within Irvine to a larger 62,000-square-foot warehouse and shortly thereafter announced their intentions to go public. The company backed out of its initial public offering that year, however.

=== Success (1992–2000) ===
Procom enjoyed a reputation for its breadth of data storage products in the early 1990s, the majority comprising hard-drive based network-attached storage (NAS) devices. In 1994, the company debuted the CD Tower line of CD-based NASes, intended for corporate clients whose networks frequently accessed and copied large amounts of data and software from CD. All drives in CD Tower units were SCSI-based; the initial lineup comprised a 7-drive unit, a 21-drive unit, and a 49-drive unit. In late 1995 or early 1996, Procom introduced the CD Tower Rax, a 56-drive unit with all hot-swappable components (barring the two redundant power supplies). The latter cost $69,000 in 1996.

Logo introduced c. 1999

By late 1996, Procom had expanded internationally, with offices in France, Germany, and Canada, and employed 200 people in total. In 1997, five years after its first IPO went nowhere, the company filed to go public again on the Nasdaq. The IPO was a success, the company netting $18 million from the sale of 2 million shares. The four co-founders each sold the majority of their stake in the company while its ticker was worth $9 per share in 1997, the proceeds from this making each a millionaire.

In the couple of years that followed the company experienced a precipitous decline in revenue owing to decreasing corporate interest in CD-based NASes in favor of developments in traditional, re-writable hard drive–based NASes, whose disk densities and cost-per-megabyte were quickly rivaling that of the CD-ROM. The company's stock price rebounded somewhat by the turn of the millennium, and in 2000 the company's stock was heavily affected by the dot-com boom, reaching an all-time high of $89.75 per share in March 2000 before dropping rapidly and bouncing again to $74 per share in June 2000 before stabilizing at $57. This was preceded by a six-quarter period of losses totaling $11 million and a 39-percent reduction in sales.

=== Decline and sale to Sun Microsystems (2000–2006) ===
In 2002, Shahrestany, Alaghband, and Aydin resigned as officers of Procom, leaving Razm'joo as the sole remaining founder still managing the company; Shahrestany and Alaghband both remained on the board of directors, however. In May 2005, Sun Microsystems agree to acquired Procom's intellectual property for $50 million. The remaining husk of the company was acquired by CNDL Acquisition Corporation, a private company founded by Razmjoo, in December 2006.
