= Donald Pederson =

American electrical engineer (1925–2004)

Donald O. Pederson
- Born: September 30, 1925; Hallock, Minnesota, United States
- Died: December 25, 2004 (aged 79); Concord, CA, United States
- Education: North Dakota Agricultural College (now North Dakota State University), Stanford University
- Known for: Circuit design, CAD, SPICE
- Awards: IEEE Medal of Honor (1998)
- Scientific career
- Fields: Electronic Engineer
- Workplaces: University of California Berkeley, New Jersey Institute of Technology
- Doctoral advisor: Joseph M. Pettit
- Doctoral students: A. Richard Newton

Donald Oscar Pederson (September 30, 1925 – December 25, 2004) was an American professor of electrical engineering at the University of California, Berkeley, and one of the designers of SPICE, a simulator for integrated circuits that has been universally used as a teaching tool and in the everyday work of circuits engineers. The IEEE Donald O. Pederson Award in Solid-State Circuits is named in his honor.

== Early life ==
Pederson was born in Hallock, Minnesota to Oscar Jorgan and Beda Emilia Pederson. He attended Fergus Falls Public Schools in Fergus Falls, Minnesota during which time he built his first crystal radio by using junkyard finds and spare parts which were given by his uncle and cousin. During those years he also saved money, and eventually bought his first soldering iron and a vacuum tube. Don's passion for electronics began in high school during physics class in Fargo, North Dakota where his parents had moved. He graduated high school at age 17 and entered Iowa State College in the autumn of 1943, but then left for the military during World War II. He served as a private in the U.S. Army in Austria, Germany, France and the Philippines from 1943 to 1946.

Upon his return from military service, he continued his undergraduate education at North Dakota Agricultural College (now North Dakota State University) and earned a bachelor's degree in electrical engineering in 1948. He then attended Stanford University for graduate school, where he received a master's degree in electrical engineering in 1949 and a Ph.D. in 1951.

Pederson remained at Stanford as a researcher in the university's electronics research lab. From 1953 to 1955, he worked at Bell Telephone Laboratories, in Murray Hill, New Jersey, and lectured at Newark College of Engineering (now New Jersey Institute of Technology). In 1955, Pederson joined the faculty of the Department of Electrical Engineering and Computer Sciences of the University of California, Berkeley as an assistant professor of electrical engineering. In the early 1970s he began work on SPICE, with his colleagues from the Electronic Research Lab. He retired in 1991, but continued to teach part-time.

Pederson died on December 25, 2004, in Concord, California, of complications from Parkinson's disease.

== Awards ==
- 1969: IEEE Education Medal
- 1984: IEEE Centennial Medal
- 1995: Phil Kaufman Award
- 1996: Computer & Communication Promotion Prize
- 1998: IEEE Medal of Honor for "creation of the SPICE Program, universally used for the computer aided design of circuits"

Pederson was a member of the National Academy of Engineering and the National Academy of Sciences. He was also a Fellow of the Institute of Electrical and Electronics Engineers, the American Association for the Advancement of Science, and the American Academy of Arts and Sciences.

== Other recognitions ==
In 1987 the Institute of Electrical and Electronics Engineers (IEEE) named one of its major awards in his honor, the IEEE Donald O. Pederson Award in Solid-State Circuits. It is a Technical Field Award given by the board of directors level of the IEEE. It had previously been simply called the IEEE Solid-State Circuits Award.

== Personal life ==
Don was married to Claire N. Pederson and together they had three daughters (Emily Sanders, Margaret Stanfield, and Katharine Rookard) and a son (John). They also had four grandchildren

After they divorced he married Karen Pederson.
