= Semiconductor Research Corporation =

American technology research consortium

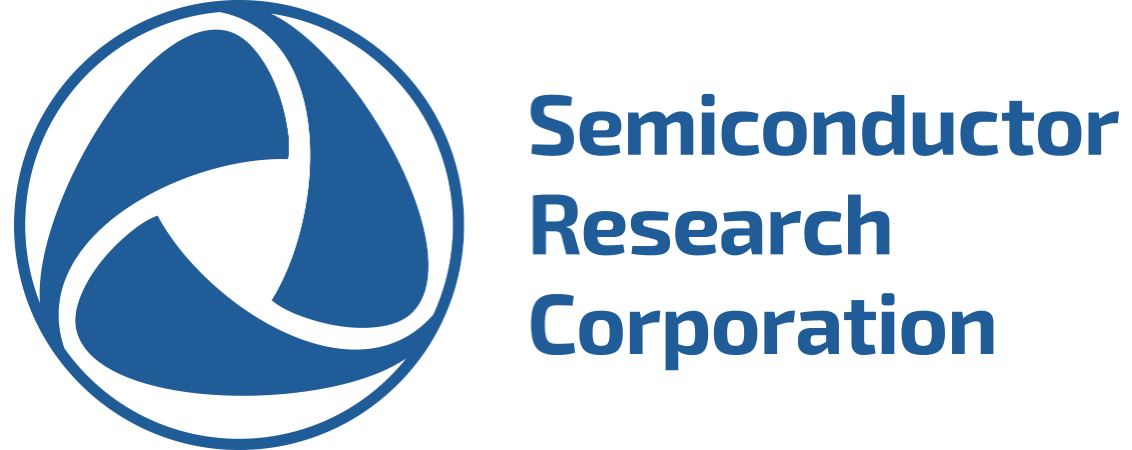
- Type: Private
- Industry: Semiconductor
- Founded: 1982; 44 years ago
- Headquarters: North Carolina, United States
- Key people: Todd Younkin (president and chief executive officer)
- Website: www.src.org

Semiconductor Research Corporation (SRC), commonly known as SRC, is a high-technology research consortium active in the semiconductor industry. It is a leading semiconductor research consortium. Todd Younkin is the incumbent president and chief executive officer of the company.

The consortium comprises more than twenty-five companies and government agencies with more than a hundred universities under contract performing research.

== History ==
SRC was founded in 1982 by Semiconductor Industry Association as a consortium to fund research and development by semiconductor companies.

In the past, it has funded university research projects in hardware and software co-design, new architectures, circuit design, transistors, memories, interconnects, and materials and has sponsored over 15,000 Bachelors, Masters, and Ph.D. students.

== Research ==
SRC has funded research in areas such as automotive, advanced memory technologies, logic and processing, advanced packaging, edge intelligence, and communications.

== Programs ==
=== Global Research Collaboration Program ===
It is an industry-led international research program with eight sub-topics including artificial intelligence hardware; analog mixed-signal circuits; computer-aided design and test; environment safety and health; hardware security; logic and memory devices; nanomanufacturing materials and processes; and packaging.

=== DARPA Partnerships ===
==== JUMP 2.0 ====
The JUMP 2.0 program is a research initiative that aims to further the development of information and communications technologies (ICT) in the United States. The program is structured into seven thematic centers, each focusing on high-risk, high-reward research projects. The primary areas of interest for JUMP 2.0 include the development of advanced artificial intelligence (AI) systems and architectures, the improvement of communication technologies for ICT systems, and the enhancement of sensing capabilities with embedded intelligence for rapid action generation.

Additionally, the program investigates distributed computing systems and architectures within an energy-efficient compute and accelerator fabric, as well as innovations in memory devices and storage arrays for intelligent memory systems. JUMP 2.0 also explores advancements in electric and photonic interconnect fabrics, advanced packaging, and novel materials and devices for digital and analog applications.

In collaboration with the National Science Foundation's Research Experiences for Undergraduates program, JUMP 2.0 supports undergraduate research in the field of semiconductors. To date, six sites have been established to provide research experiences for undergraduate students in this area.

==== Joint University Microelectronics Program ====
Joint University Microelectronics Program (JUMP) was a research program that ran from 2018 to 2022. JUMP focused on energy-efficient electronics, including actuation and sensing, signal processing, computing, and intelligent storage.

==== STARnet ====
STARnet was a collaborative university research program that ran from 2013 to 2017, focusing on state-of-the-art technology developments for microelectronics research and development. This program allocated at least $40 million annually to basic research funding.

==== Focus Center Research Program ====
The Focus Center Research Program (FCRP) began in 1998 and spanned multiple phases until its end in 2013. The research within the program was primarily concentrated on materials, structures, and devices, as well as circuits, systems, and software to develop new methods for device fabrication and integration for deeply-scaled transistors and architectures for high-performance mixed-signal circuits to meet military requirements.

== Industry guidance ==
Semiconductor Research Corporation (SRC) published the Microelectronics and Advanced Packaging Technologies (MAPT) Roadmap in 2023. The technology consortium was selected by the Advanced Manufacturing Office of the National Institute of Standards and Technology (NIST), which is part of the U.S. Department of Commerce, to develop this roadmap with an emphasis on emerging MAPT technologies.

The MAPT Roadmap was developed through a collaborative effort involving researchers from different organizations spanning industry, academia, and government. It outlines critical research priorities for the semiconductor industry and provides recommendations based on a comprehensive analysis of challenges, promising technologies, key findings, trends, and the necessity for foundational capabilities within the semiconductor research and development (R&D) ecosystem.

In 2021, SRC and the Semiconductor Industry Association (SIA) published the Decadal Plan for Semiconductors. The plan calls for an additional $3.4 billion in federal research and development funding to address challenges and maintain the industry's technological advancement in areas such as smart sensing, memory and storage, communications, security, and energy efficiency.

== Recognition ==
In 2005, SRC received the National Medal of Technology and Innovation awarded by the president of the United States for their collaborative high-tech university research and for creating the concept and methodology, named the International Technology Roadmap for Semiconductors.

In 2015, SRC was inducted into Georgia Tech's Hill Society for sponsoring $103 million in research grants, contracts, and fellowships since 1983.
