= Semiconductor Industry Association =

Trade association

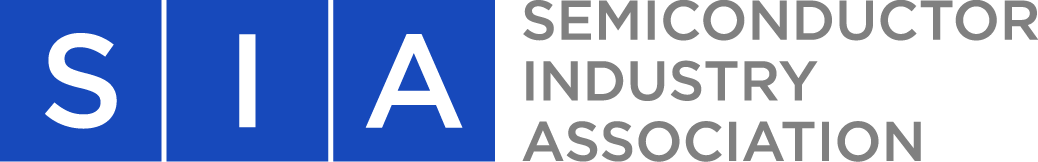
- Type: Trade association
- Industry: Semiconductor industry
- Founded: 1977; 49 years ago
- Headquarters: United States
- Key people: Michael Robbins (President & CEO)
- Website: www.semiconductors.org

The Semiconductor Industry Association (SIA) is a trade association and lobbying group founded in 1977 that represents the United States semiconductor industry. It is located in Washington, D.C.

== Overview ==
It was founded in 1977 by Wilfred Corrigan, Robert Noyce, Jerry Sanders, Charles Sporck and John Welty (of Motorola, Inc.).

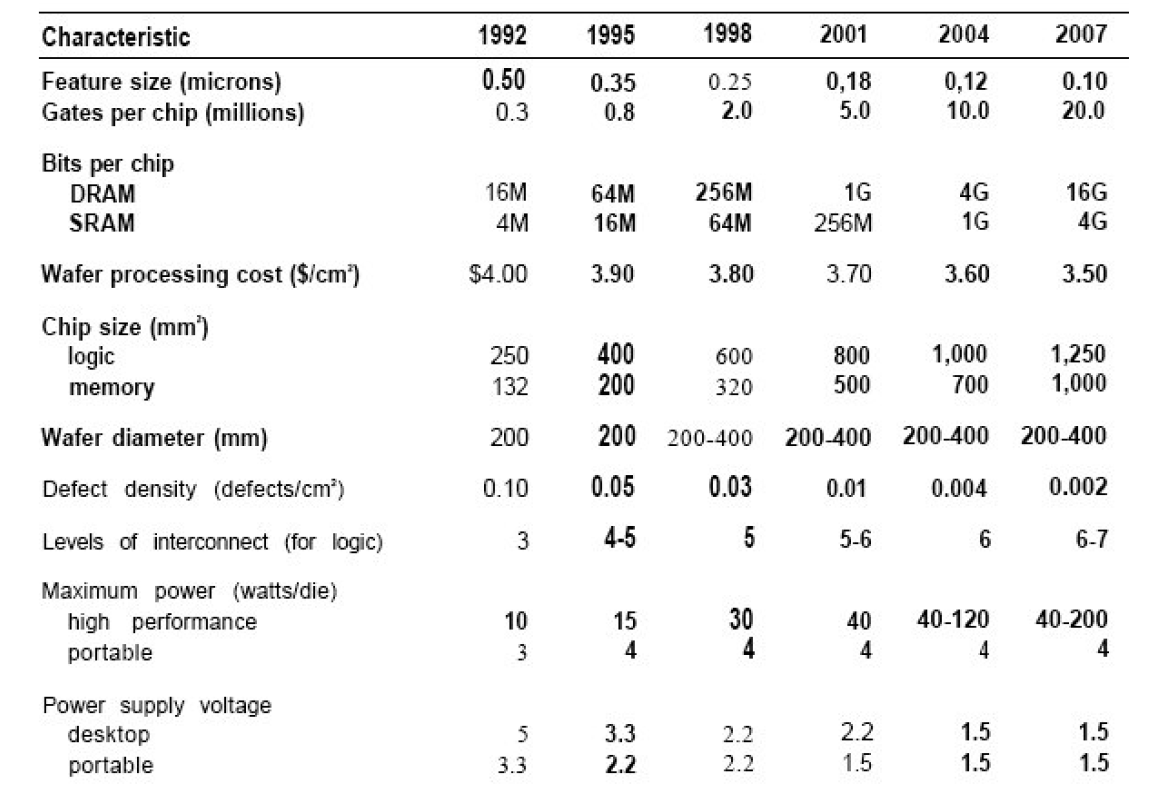
The first semiconductor road map, published by the SIA in 1993. It outlined the predicted progress of the semiconductor industry over the following 15 years.

In 1982, SIA formed Semiconductor Research Corporation (SRC) with dual objectives of developing highly qualified technical personnel for employment in the industry and conducting a program of long-range, pre-competitive research and technology development.

SIA created the first National Technology Roadmap for Semiconductors, in the early 1990s.

=== CHIPS for America Act ===
In 2022, SIA lobbied strongly in favor of the bipartisan legislation known as CHIPS for America Act, which invested in the U.S. semiconductor industry for greater semiconductor supply chain independence from countries like South Korea, Taiwan and China. The CHIPS Act was signed into law on August 9, 2022.

=== Tariffs on China ===
The SIA in general has not been supportive of strong tariffs imposed on China (see China–United States trade war). Former CEO John Neuffer of SIA stated: "We have made the case to the [Trump] administration, in the strongest possible terms, that tariffs imposed on semiconductors imported from China will hurt America's chip-makers, not China's, and will do nothing to stop China's problematic and discriminatory trade practices".

== See also ==
- SEMI
