= ESD Alliance =

Consortium for electronic design automation

The Electronic System Design Alliance (ESD Alliance) is the international association of companies that provide tools and services for electronic design automation. Until 2016 it was known as the Electronic Design Automation Consortium (EDA Consortium, EDAC). In 2018, the ESD Alliance became a SEMI Technology Community.

It defines itself as "a forum to address technical, marketing, economic and legislative issues affecting the entire industry. It acts as the central voice to communicate and promote the value of the semiconductor design industry as a vital component of the global electronics industry".

The 2016 name change reflects the expansion of its charter to address the changes in the industry towards a more system-oriented approach, embracing both integrated circuits design (its past focus) and electronic systems design.

The organization, then known as EDAC, was established in 1989 and incorporated in 1992.

In 1994 the organization established the Phil Kaufman Award to recognize people by their contributions to electronic design automation.
