= EasyEDA =

Web-based EDA tool suite

- Original authors: Dillon He, Eric Cui
- Developers: JiaLiChuang (HongKong) Co., Limited
- Release: August 2013; 13 years ago
- Stable release: 6.4.25 / September 14, 2021
- Platform: Cloud (accessed via web-browser)
- Available in: 13 languages
- List of languages English, French, German, Polish, Japanese, Russian, Spanish, Swedish, Ukrainian, Chinese Simplified, Vietnamese, Czech, Portuguese
- Type: EDA software
- License: Commercial
- Website: easyeda.com

EasyEDA is a web-based electronic design automation (EDA) tool suite that enables hardware engineers to design, simulate, share (publicly and privately) and discuss schematics, simulations and printed circuit boards, and to create a bill of materials, Gerber files, pick and place files and documentary outputs in the file formats PDF, PNG, and SVG.

EasyEDA allows creating and editing schematic diagrams, SPICE simulation of mixed analogue and digital circuits and creating and editing printed circuit board layouts, and optionally, manufacturing printed circuit boards.

Subscription-free membership is available for public projects plus a limited number of private projects. The number of private projects can be increased by contributing high quality public projects, schematic symbols, and printed circuit board (PCB) footprints and/or by paying a monthly fee.

Registered users can download Gerber files from the tool free of charge; but for a fee, EasyEDA offers a PCB fabrication service. This service is also able to accept Gerber file inputs from third-party tools.

EasyEDA is a division of JLCPCB.

== History ==
In June 2010, Dillon He and Eric Cui started a survey of EDA tools for a hardware project of their own. The search for an EDA tool capable of schematic capture, electronic circuit simulation and printed circuit board layout saw limited success, and He concluded that designing their own EDA tool would be beneficial.

Their key goals were that the tools be platform independent, free, easy to learn and to use.

The first version of the toolsuite appeared online in August 2013 and since officially launching in March 2014, the tool has developed rapidly with several major revisions and enhancements

EasyEDA first received external investment in January 2015 and attracted more that November.

== Features ==
EasyEDA is an integrated browser-based tool for schematic capture, SPICE circuit simulation (based on Ngspice) and PCB layout.

Import from Altium Designer, CircuitMaker, Eagle, Kicad and LTspice file formats as well as generic SPICE netlists is supported. SPICE netlists can be exported to third party simulation tools and export of PCB netlists in Altium, PADS and FreePCB formats is also supported.

The ability to import LTspice schematics and symbols provides a useful way to port schematics to PCB layout without having to redraw them from scratch.

Once Gerber files of a completed PCB design have been downloaded and checked - using a third party Gerber viewer - the user is free to choose a PCB manufacturer or, for a fee, they can submit the Gerbers directly to EasyEDA for manufacture. Alternatively, printable PCB layer image output is also supported in PDF, PNG and SVG formats for home PCB etching.

The tool also includes sharing and collaboration features and a comprehensive parts and an expanding SPICE model library.

== See also ==
- Comparison of EDA software
- List of free electronics circuit simulators
- Electronic design automation (EDA)
- Electronic circuit simulation
