= DipTrace =

EDA/CAD software for creating schematic diagrams and printed circuit boards

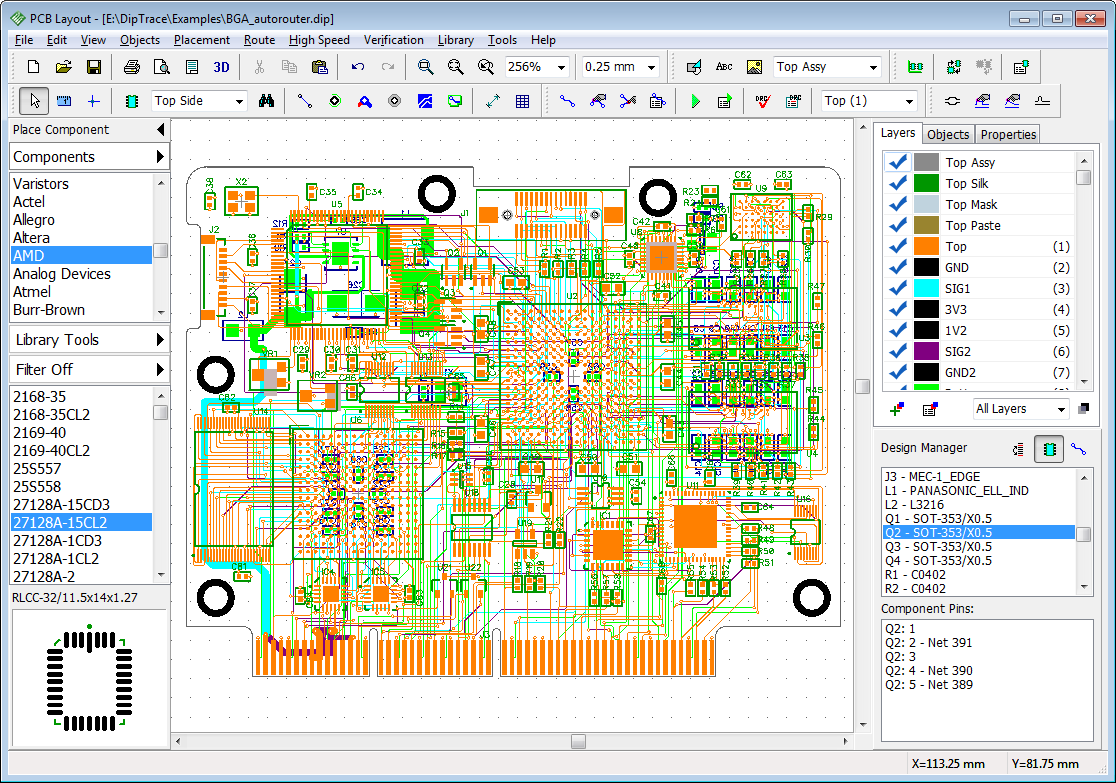
- PCB layout in DipTrace v3 (2016)
- Developer: Novarm Ltd
- Release: August 2004; 22 years ago
- Stable release: 5.3.5.1 / 28 September 2026
- Written in: Delphi
- Operating system: Windows XP to 11; Linux (Wine); macOS Catalina & Big Sur
- Available in: 22 languages
- Type: EDA
- License: Trialware
- Website: diptrace.com

DipTrace is a proprietary software suite for electronic design automation (EDA) used for electronic schematic capture and printed circuit board layouts. DipTrace has four applications: schematic editor, PCB editor with built-in shape-based autorouter and 3D preview, component editor (schematic symbol), and pattern editor (PCB footprint).

== Features ==
- Simple user interface
- Multi-sheet and hierarchical schematics
- Analog and digital SPICE simulator
- High-speed and differential signal routing
- Manual push-and-shove routing
- Wide import/export capabilities
- Shape-based autorouter
- Advanced verifications with real-time DRC
- Real-time 3D PCB preview

=== 3D preview ===
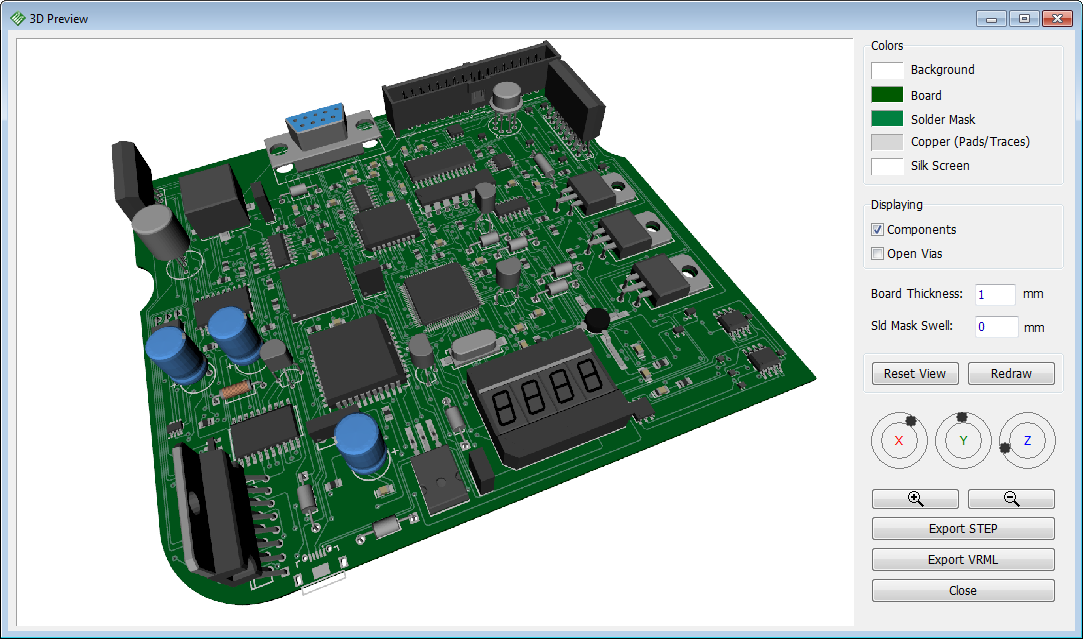
Screenshot of 3D preview in DipTrace v3 (2016)

This module includes real-time 3D preview & export feature. It shows the model of the manufactured printed circuit board with all components installed. Rotate board in three axes, zoom in and out in real time, change colors of the board, copper areas, solder mask, silkscreen, and background. 3D preview works on all stages of the design. Board can be exported to STEP or VRML 2.0 formats for mechanical CAD modeling. More than 7500 3D models of PCB packages are supplied for free. Externally designed 3D models in *.wrl, *.step, *.iges, and *.3ds formats can be uploaded and attached to patterns in Pattern Editor or PCB Layout.

=== Import / Export ===
As of DipTrace version 5, it supports the following file importing and exporting (per software menus).

Schematic Editor import:

- Altium ASCII, DipTrace ASCII, DipTrace XML, Eagle Schematic, KiCad Schematic, OrCAD EDIF Schematic, P-CAD ASCII, P-CAD PDIF, PADS SCH ASCII 2005.

Schematic Editor export:

- DXF, PDF, Bill of Materials (BOM), DipTrace ASCII, DipTrace XML, Eagle Schematic, P-CAD ASCII, SPICE Netlist, Schematic Netlist (Accel, Allegro, KiCad, Mentor, OrCAD, PADS, P-CAD, Protel 2.0, Tango).

PCB Editor import:

- DXF, Gerber, N/C Drill, Altium ASCII, DipTrace ASCII, DipTrace XML, Eagle Board, KiCad Board, OrCAD MIN Interchange, P-CAD ASCII, P-CAD PDIF, PADS PCB ASCII 2005, Sprint-Layout 6.0 Text-IO, Autorouter SES, PCB Netlist (Accel, Allegro, KiCad, Mentor, OrCAD, PADS, P-CAD, Protel 2.0, Tango).

PCB Editor export:

- DXF, PDF, Gerber, Gerber X2, ODB++, IPC-2581C, IPC-D-356A, N/C Drill, Mach 2/3 Drill, OrCAD TAP Drill, Bill of Materials (BOM), Pick and Place, DipTrace ASCII, DipTrace XML, Eagle Board, P-CAD ASCII, PADS PCB ASCII 2005, OrCAD MIN Interchange, Autorouter DSN, 3D Image (STEP, VRML).

Component Editor import:

- DipTrace ASCII, DipTrace XML, Eagle XML (*.lbr), Eagle Script (*.scr), KiCad Library (*.lib), Altium ASCII (*.lia), P-CAD ASCII (*.lia), PADS ASCII (*.p, *.c), BSDL Pinlist (*.bsd, *.bsdl, *.bsm).

Component Editor export:

- DipTrace ASCII, DipTrace XML, Eagle XML (*.lbr).

Pattern Editor import:

- DipTrace ASCII, DipTrace XML, Eagle XML (*.lbr), Eagle Script (*.scr), KiCad Footprints, P-CAD/Altium ASCII (*.lia), PADS ASCII (*.p, *.d).

Pattern Editor export:

- DipTrace ASCII, DipTrace XML, Eagle XML (*.lbr).

== Modules ==
DipTrace has a launcher application with five buttons that allows a user to quickly start each DipTrace module:

1. Schematic Editor
2. PCB Editor
3. Component Editor
4. Pattern Editor
5. Get Started with Video Guide (link to video and PDF tutorial webpage)

=== Schematic editor ===
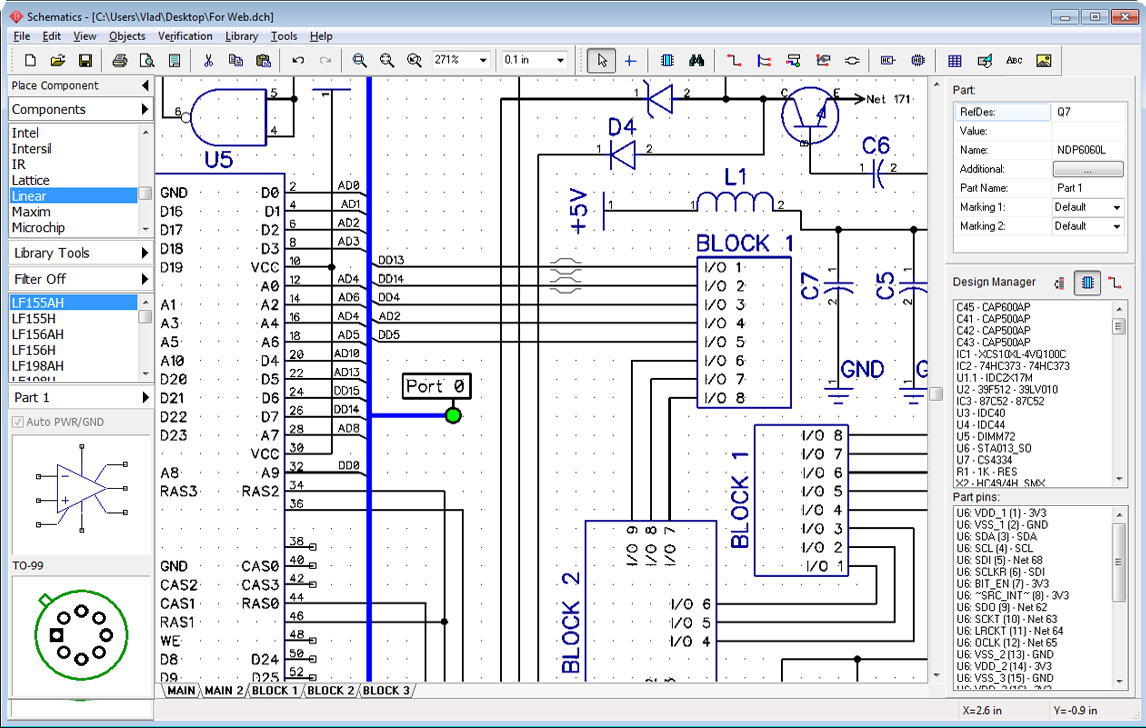
Screenshot of schematic capture in DipTrace v3 (2016)

Advanced circuit design tool with support of multi-sheet and multi-level hierarchical schematics that delivers a number of features for visual and logical pin connections. Cross-module management ensures that principal circuits can be easily converted into a PCB, back-annotated, or imported/exported from/to other EDA software, CAD formats and net-lists. DipTrace Schematic has ERC verification and Spice export for external simulation.

=== PCB editor ===
Engineering tool for board design with smart manual routing, differential pairs, length-matching tools, shape-based autorouter, advanced verification, layer stackup manager, and wide import/export capabilities. Design requirements are defined by net classes, class-to-class rules, and detailed settings by object types for each class or layer. When routing with real-time DRC, the program reports errors on the fly before actually making them. DRC also checks length and phase tolerances for differential pairs and controls signal synchronization for nets and buses (including layer stackup and bonding wire induced signal delays). The board can be previewed in 3D and exported to STEP format for mechanical CAD modeling. Design rule check with in-depth detailing and net connectivity verification procedures are available.

=== Component editor ===
Manage component libraries and create single- or multi-part components by selecting a template and its dimensions, defining visual and electrical pin parameters, setting up a Spice model, and attaching pattern with a 3D model to finalize component creation. BSDL import, bulk pin naming, and pin manager tools for pins and buses. Importing libraries from different EDA formats. More than 140000 components in standard libraries.

=== Pattern editor ===
Draw patterns with various types of shapes, pads, holes, and dimensions. Circle, lines (headers, DIP), square (QFP), matrix (BGA), rectangle (RQFP), and zig-zag standard templates. Creation of pattern is basically selecting a template, entering a couple of vital parameters, drawing the silkscreen, and launching automatic pad renumbering. Custom templates can be created for non-standard patterns. DXF import makes creating complex layouts easier.

== Pricing ==
Edition	Maximum pins/pads	Maximum signal layers	Business price	Non-profit price	Academic price
Full	Unlimited	Unlimited	$995	$348	Discount
Extended	2000	6	$695	$248	Discount
Standard	1000	4	$395	$125	Discount
Lite	500	2‡	$145	Free†	Free
Starter	300	2‡	$75	Free	—N/a

- Note: Non-profit hobbyists can request a free "Lite" upgrade. †
- Note: Unlimited plane layers (power, ground) for all editions, which means 2 signal layers editions can create 4-layer boards. ‡

=== Free versions ===
A version of DipTrace is freely available with all the functionality of the full package except that it is limited to 300 pins and non-commercial use or 500 pins (non-commercial use, contact for free upgrade) and two signal layers. Power and ground plane layers do not count as signal layers, so the free versions can create four-layer boards with full power and ground planes. No board size restrictions.

== Version history ==
=== Version 5.0 ===
- Released September 12, 2024

=== Version 4.3 ===
- Released July 27, 2022
- Built-in Spice simulator.
- XML for PCB, Schematic, Component Editor and Pattern Editor.
- SMD / THT pads in PCB Layout design information.
- Custom column title for BOM, Pick and Place.

=== Version 4.2 ===
- Released November 2, 2021
- New XML format for component and pattern libraries
- Environment Variables in all paths
- Edge rails for a single board option.
- Radial / Polar placement of design objects in PCB Layout and Pattern Editor
- Side and isometric view buttons in 3D preview dialogs

=== Version 4.1 ===
- Released February 3, 2021
- Improved panelizing
- Improved BOM
- Improved pick and place
- Import/Export improvements
- Raster pictures in PCB

=== Version 4.0 ===
- Released May 20, 2020
- Arc trace routing
- Teardrop connections to pads and T-junctions
- `IPC-7351 libraries & patterns
- Round rectangle & D-shape pads
- Courtyard layer
- Component outline layer
- Similar pad numbers are allowed
- Three methods to create 3D models
- Obround shapes instead of ellipses
- Etch text or picture/logo in copper pour

=== Version 3.3 ===
- Released October 22, 2018

=== Version 3.2 ===
- Released October 26, 2017
- Length matching rules.
- Real-time length comparison table.
- Layer stackup table.
- Using layer stackup and pad signal delay for trace length and differential pair phase calculation.
- Meander tool for any trace, easy resizing and moving of meanders.
- DRC same net clearance check (Trace to Trace, SMD to Pad, SMD to Via, SMD to SMD).
- Altium ASCII import (Schematic, PCB, libraries).
- Eagle XML import (Schematic, PCB, libraries).

=== Version 3.1 ===
- Released May 29, 2017

=== Version 3.0 ===
- Released March 10, 2016
- Differential pairs: define differential pair and its rules; automatic or manual defining of paired pads; paired routing and editing of differential pair; single-track differential pair routing and editing; phase tune tool (place custom / regular size meanders); real-time control of phase and length tolerance; differential pair manager; support of differential pairs for external autorouters, recognition of paired traces.
- Custom user-defined keyboard shortcuts for tools and dialogs.
- ODB++ (version 7.0) manufacturing output.
- Gerber X2 manufacturing output.
- DRC rule details (easy editing of routing constraints).
- Tree view of 3D models in All Models list, sorted by categories (folders).
- Overall speed and memory optimization for large designs.
- Optimized UI fonts.
- 8143 new components.
- 5694 new STEP models for 3D.

== Community ==
Some hobby and educational groups such as the PICAXE forum members have developed libraries specific to the PICAXE range of microcontroller as produced by Revolution Education including many of the frequently used associated integrated circuits. PICAXE related libraries can be found in the net.

== See also ==
- Comparison of EDA software
- List of free electronics circuit simulators
