= Oregano (software) =

Electronic circuit design software

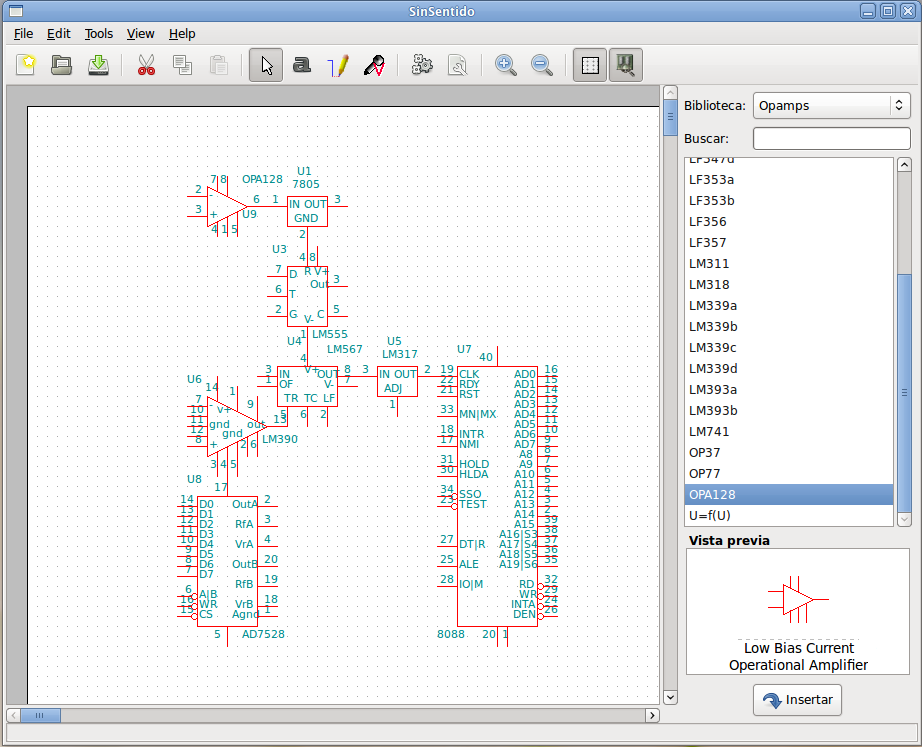
- Oregano running on Linux
- Original author: Richard Hult
- Developers: Guido Trentalancia, Bernhard Schuster, Marc Lorber, Ricardo Markiewicz and Andrés de Barbará
- Stable release: 0.84.43 / 23 January 2020; 6 years ago
- Operating system: Unix-like
- License: GPL-2.0-or-later
- Website: github.com/drahnr/oregano
- Repository: github.com/drahnr/oregano

Oregano is a graphical software application for schematic capture and simulation of electrical circuits. The actual simulation is performed by the SPICE, Ngspice or Gnucap engines. It is similar to gEDA and KTechlab. It makes use of GNOME technology and is meant to run on free Unix-like operating systems such as Linux, FreeBSD et al.

== History ==
Oregano was first developed by Richard Hult, who worked on it until 2002. Most of the design ideas and a lot of the current code are still his. He released various versions, up to version 0.23. All of them were based on the Spice engine, and supported only the old GNOME libraries.

When Richard Hult stated that he wouldn't be able to continue developing the software, Ricardo Markiewicz and Andrés de Barbará continued his work, releasing a renewed Oregano, with support for the latest graphical libraries and adding support for the Gnucap engine, among other things.

Marc Lorber ported the whole code base from gtk+-2.x to gtk+-3.x. Bernhard Schuster took over the project in early 2013.

== See also ==
- Comparison of EDA Software
- List of free electronics circuit simulators
- Dependencies: GNOME, SPICE, Ngspice or Gnucap
