= Proteus Design Suite =

Electronic design automation software

- A screenshot of Proteus Design Suite
- Developer: Labcenter Electronics Ltd.
- Release: 1988
- Stable release: 9.1 / October 1, 2025; 12 months ago
- Operating system: Windows
- Type: Electronic design automation
- Licence: Proprietary
- Website: www.labcenter.com

The Proteus Design Suite is a proprietary software tool suite used primarily for electronic design automation. The software is used mainly by electronic design engineers and technicians to create schematics and electronic prints for manufacturing printed circuit boards.

It was developed in Yorkshire, England by Labcenter Electronics Ltd and is available in English, French, Spanish and Chinese languages.

== History ==
The first version of what is now the Proteus Design Suite was called PC-B and was written by the company chairman, John Jameson, for DOS in 1988. Schematic Capture support followed in 1990, with a port to the Windows environment shortly thereafter. Mixed mode SPICE Simulation was first integrated into Proteus in 1996 and microcontroller simulation then arrived in Proteus in 1998. Shape based autorouting was added in 2002 and 2006 saw another major product update with 3D Board Visualisation. More recently, a dedicated IDE for simulation was added in 2011 and MCAD import/export was included in 2015. Support for high speed design was added in 2017. Feature led product releases are typically biannual, while maintenance based service packs are released as it is required.

== Product Modules ==
The Proteus Design Suite is a Windows application for schematic capture, simulation, and PCB (Printed Circuit Board) layout design. It can be purchased in many configurations, depending on the size of designs being produced and the requirements for microcontroller simulation. All PCB Design products include an autorouter and basic mixed mode SPICE simulation capabilities.

=== Schematic Capture ===
Schematic capture in the Proteus Design Suite is used for both the simulation of designs and as the design phase of a PCB layout project. It is therefore a core component and is included with all product configurations.

=== Microcontroller Simulation ===
The micro-controller simulation in Proteus works by applying either a hex file or a debug file to the microcontroller part on the schematic. It is then co-simulated along with any analog and digital electronics connected to it. This enables its use in a broad spectrum of project prototyping in areas such as motor control, temperature control and user interface design. It also finds use in the general hobbyist community and, since no hardware is required, is convenient to use as a training or teaching tool. Support is available for co-simulation of:

- Microchip Technologies PIC10, PIC12, PIC16, PIC18, PIC24, dsPIC33 microcontrollers
- Atmel AVR (and Arduino), 8051 and ARM Cortex-M3 microcontrollers
- NXP 8051, ARM7, ARM Cortex-M0 and ARM Cortex-M3 microcontrollers
- Texas Instruments MSP430, PICCOLO DSP and ARM Cortex-M3 microcontrollers
- Parallax Basic Stamp, Freescale HC11, 8086 microcontrollers

=== PCB Design ===
The PCB Layout module is automatically given connectivity information in the form of a netlist from the schematic capture module. It applies this information, together with the user specified design rules and various design automation tools, to assist with error free board design. PCB's of up to 16 copper layers can be produced with design size limited by product configuration.

=== 3D Verification ===
The 3D Viewer module allows the board under development to be viewed in 3D together with a semi-transparent height plane that represents the boards enclosure. STEP output can then be used to transfer to mechanical CAD software such as Solidworks or Autodesk for accurate mounting and positioning of the board.

== See also ==
- Comparison of EDA software
- List of free electronics circuit simulators
