= Circuits Cloud =

Analog/digital circuits simulator

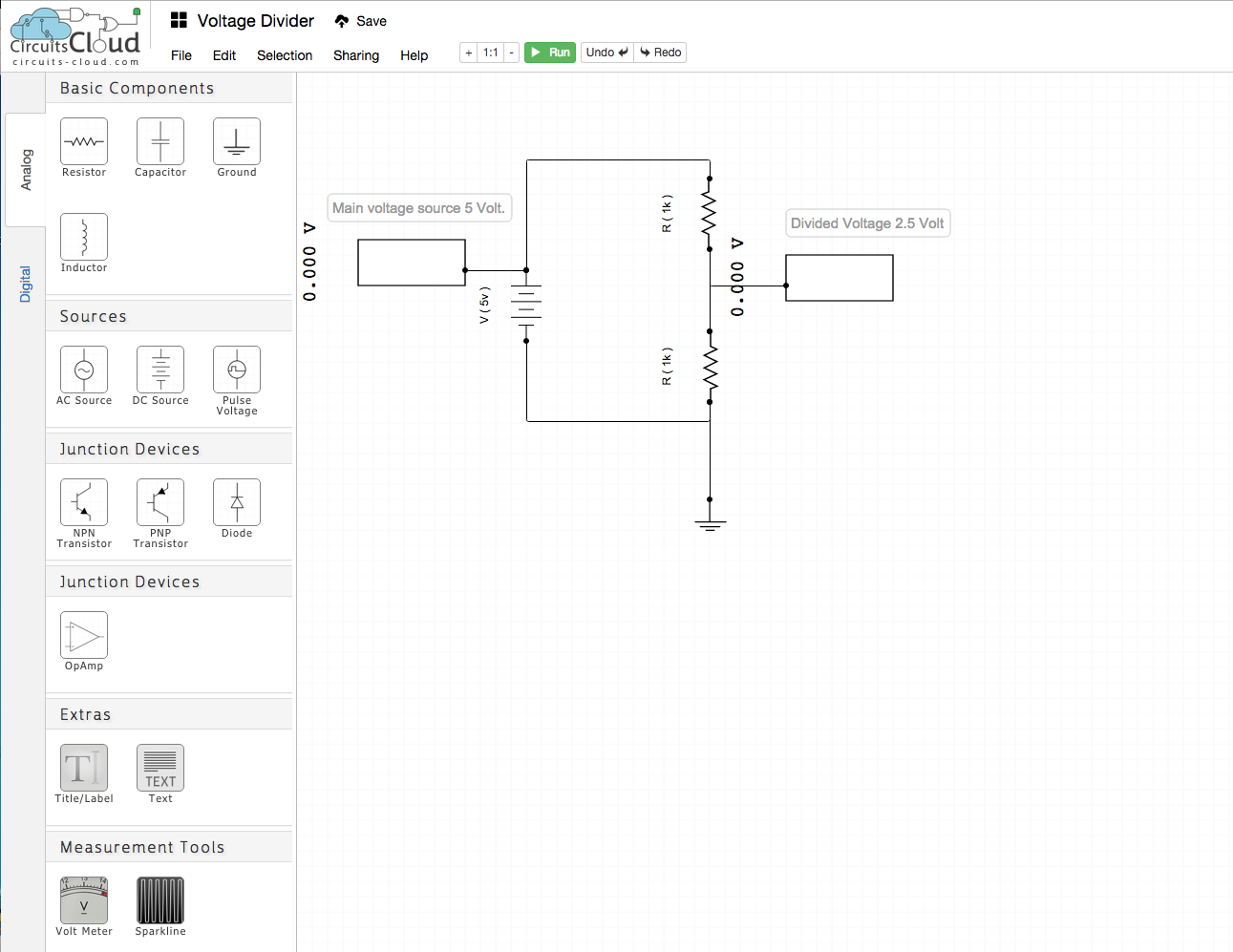
- Simulating the voltage divider circuit in Circuits Cloud
- Original author: Script For Information Technology Solutions
- Developer: Shaffee Mayoof
- Release: June 20, 2014; 12 years ago
- Stable release: 3.1 Build 1A001
- Platform: Linux, PHP
- Available in: English
- Type: Electronic design automation
- Website: https://opencircuits.net/

OpenCircuits (formerly Circuits Cloud) is a free, web-based electronic circuit simulator that allows users to design and simulate analog and digital circuits directly within a web browser. Features

Simulation: Uses NGSPICE for backend analog circuit simulation alongside digital logic simulation tools.

Cloud-Based: Operates entirely online via HTML5 without requiring local software installation.

== History ==
Circuits Cloud was created and developed for educational purposes, by Eng. Shaffee Mayoof. The initial release was on 20 June 2014. Circuits Cloud was initially developed as an online digital circuits simulator, but updated later on by Eng. Mayoof and computer engineering students who were candidates in the industrial training program provided by the application owner, Script For Information Technology Solutions, to support analog circuits simulation.

== See also ==
- Comparison of EDA Software
- List of free electronics circuit simulators
