= XCircuit =

Electrical circuit design software

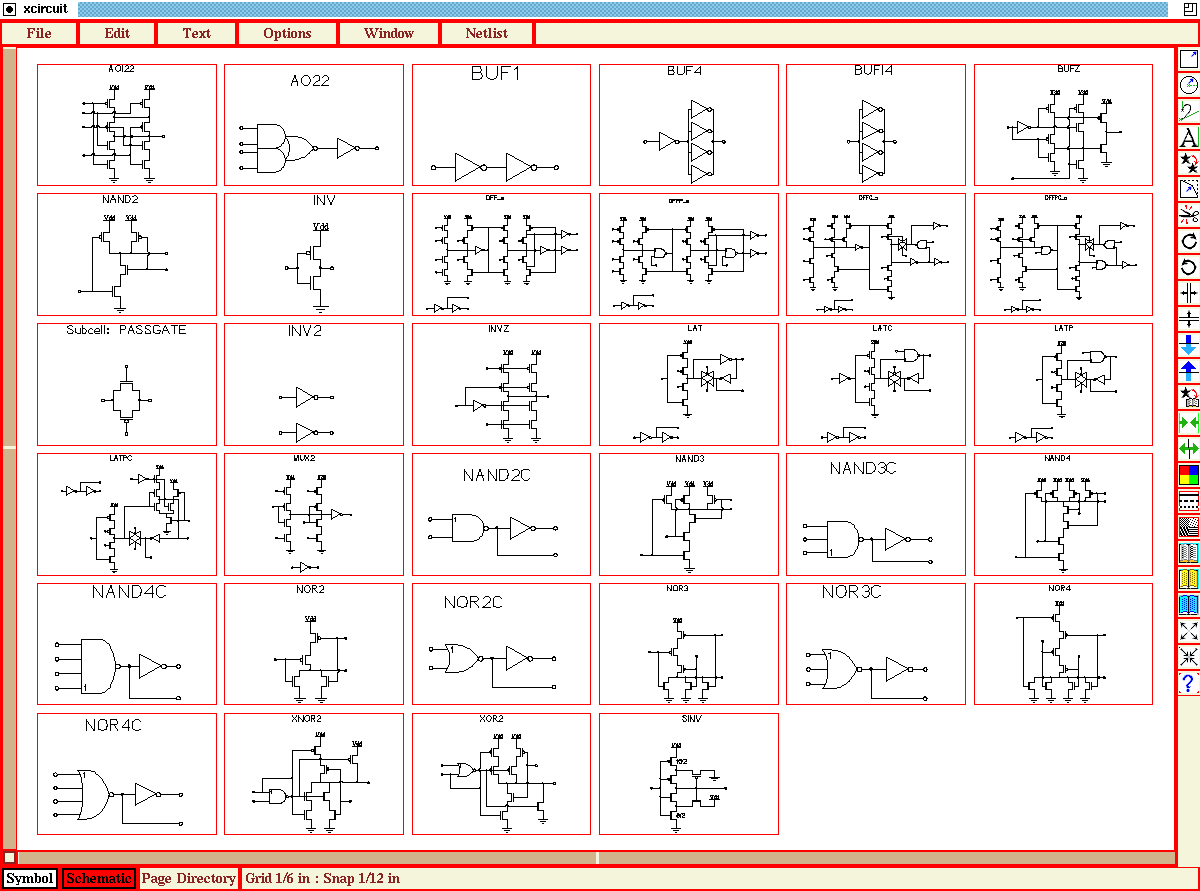
- XCircuit screenshot
- Original author: Tim Edwards
- Developer: Tim Edwards
- Release: 1993; 33 years ago
- Stable release: 3.10.45 / 27 July 2026; 53 days ago
- Operating system: Cross-platform
- Type: Diagramming software
- License: GPL
- Website: opencircuitdesign.com/xcircuit/
- Repository: github.com/RTimothyEdwards/XCircuit

XCircuit is a schematic capture program for drawing publication-quality VLSI electrical circuit schematic diagrams and related figures. It's part of the Open Circuit Design tools. It's primarily intended for ULSI/VLSI IC design and not for PCB design, the latter though is still possible. XCircuit regards circuits as inherently hierarchical and can save circuits both in PostScript (.ps) and Ngspice (.cir) netlists (hierarchical or flattened) file formats for further processing (e.g. for Layout vs. Schematic check). The program compiles PostScript files from special template-labels specified by user.

XCircuit allows components to be saved in and retrieved from editable libraries. XCircuit does not separate artistic expression from circuit drawing; it maintains flexibility in style without compromising the power of schematic capture.

It supports both Unix/X11 and Windows platforms. XCircuit doesn't support imports of any other file formats besides PostScript and SPICE.

== History ==
XCircuit was written and is maintained by Tim Edwards, currently with Efabless Corp., formerly with the Johns Hopkins University Applied Physics Laboratory in Laurel, Maryland. XCircuit was initially written in the summer of 1993 as a drawing program to render circuit diagrams for an undergraduate electrical engineering course in the Johns Hopkins University Whiting School of Engineering Part-time programs. Since then it has expanded to encompass schematic capture and is used by people all over the world for both presentations and as an EDA (Electronic Design Automation) tool.

== PCB layout ==
XCircuit doesn't provide PCB layout editing, instead this task can be accomplished by using gEDA PCB program that can use net-lists and other files from XCircuit.

== File formats ==
- .ps (PostScript), .cir (ngspice) - Import/Export
- .lps - Library in PostScript format (technology files)
- .jpg/.png - Import
- .txt
- EDIF - Import only
- .svg - Export only

== See also ==
- Comparison of EDA software
- List of free and open-source EDA software
- List of free electronics circuit simulators
