= Comparison of EDA software =

Electronic Device automation

This page is a comparison of electronic design automation (EDA) software which is used today to design the near totality of electronic devices. Modern electronic devices are too complex to be designed without the help of a computer. Electronic devices may consist of integrated circuits (ICs), integrated circuit substrates, printed circuit boards (PCBs), field-programmable gate arrays (FPGAs) or a combination of them. Integrated circuits may consist of a combination of digital and analog circuits. These circuits can contain a combination of transistors, resistors, capacitors or specialized components such as analog neural networks, antennas or fuses.

The design of each of these electronic devices generally proceeds from a high- to a low-level of abstraction. For FPGAs the low-level description consists of a binary file to be flashed into the gate array, while for an integrated circuit or printed circuit board the low-level description consists of a layout file which describes the masks to be used for lithography inside a foundry.

Each design step requires specialized tools, and many of these tools can be used for designing multiple types of electronic circuits. For example, a program for high-level digital synthesis can usually be used both for IC digital design as well as for programming an FPGA. Similarly, a tool for schematic-capture and analog simulation can generally be used both for analog IC design and for PCB design.

In the case of integrated circuits (ICs) for example, a single chip may contain today more than 20 billion transistors and, as a general rule, every single transistor in a chip must work as intended. Since a single VLSI mask set can cost up to 10-100 millions, trial and error approaches are not economically viable. To minimize the risk of any design mistakes, the design flow is heavily automated. EDA software assists the designer in every step of the design process and every design step is accompanied by heavy test phases. Errors may be present in the high-level code already, such as for the Pentium FDIV floating-point unit bug, or it can be inserted all the way down to physical synthesis, such as a missing wire, or a timing violation.

== Comparison of proprietary EDA software ==
=== Mainstream EDA software bundles for ICs design ===
The world of electronic design automation (EDA) software for integrated circuit (IC) design is dominated by the three vendors Synopsys, Cadence Design Systems and Siemens EDA (Formerly Mentor Graphics, acquired in 2017 by Siemens) which have a revenue respectively of 4,2 billion US$, 3 billion US$ and 1,3 billion US$.

These vendors offer software bundles which allow to cover the full spectrum of IC design, from HDL synthesis to physical synthesis and verification.

The development of EDA software for IC design is tightly connected with the development of technology nodes. The properties of a specific semiconductor foundry, such as the transistor models, the physical characteristics and the design rules, are usually encoded in file formats which are proprietary to one or more EDA vendors. This set of files constitutes the process design kit (PDK) and it is usually developed as a joint effort between the foundry and an EDA vendor. Foundries therefore usually release PDKs which are compatible only for one specific EDA bundle. The information contained inside PDKs is usually considered confidential. PDKs are therefore usually protected by non disclosure agreements (NDAs) and may be shipped in an incomplete or in an encrypted form to the designers.

=== Proprietary software for electrical simulation (analog/mixed-signal/electromagnetic) ===
Application and developer	Platform	Latest release		Schematic?	Simulation?	PCB editing?	User Interface Language(s)	Imports	Exports	Scripting support
Application and developer	Platform	Version	Date	Schematic?	Simulation?	PCB editing?	User Interface Language(s)	Imports	Exports	Scripting support
Advanced Design System by Keysight EEsof EDA	POSIX	2019	2018-11-15	No	Yes, full-wave electromagnetic simulation and netlist simulation	Yes	en	HSPICE, SPICE, Spectre netlists; Gerber, Excellon, ODB++, artwork; more	HSPICE, SPICE, Spectre netlists; Gerber, Excellon, ODB++, artwork; more	Python, Application Extension Language (proprietary; "AEL")
Advanced Design System by Keysight EEsof EDA	Windows	2019	2018-11-15	No	Yes, full-wave electromagnetic simulation and netlist simulation	Yes	en	HSPICE, SPICE, Spectre netlists; Gerber, Excellon, ODB++, artwork; more	HSPICE, SPICE, Spectre netlists; Gerber, Excellon, ODB++, artwork; more	Python, Application Extension Language (proprietary; "AEL")
Advanced Design System by Keysight EEsof EDA	SuSE	2019	2018-11-15	No	Yes, full-wave electromagnetic simulation and netlist simulation	Yes	en	HSPICE, SPICE, Spectre netlists; Gerber, Excellon, ODB++, artwork; more	HSPICE, SPICE, Spectre netlists; Gerber, Excellon, ODB++, artwork; more	Python, Application Extension Language (proprietary; "AEL")
Advanced Design System by Keysight EEsof EDA	RHEL	2019	2018-11-15	No	Yes, full-wave electromagnetic simulation and netlist simulation	Yes	en	HSPICE, SPICE, Spectre netlists; Gerber, Excellon, ODB++, artwork; more	HSPICE, SPICE, Spectre netlists; Gerber, Excellon, ODB++, artwork; more	Python, Application Extension Language (proprietary; "AEL")
CircuitLogix by Logic Design	Windows	10	2019-01	No	Yes, netlist simulation (analog and digital)	Yes	en	SPICE netlist and model formats	SPICE, PDF, Gerber, DXF	
LTspice by Analog Devices (free)	Windows, macOS, Wine	26.0.1	2026-01-14	Yes	Yes, netlist simulation (analog)	No	en	netlist	netlist	
Micro-Cap (free, end-of-life)	Windows	12.2.0.5	2021-06-17 (end-of-life)	Yes	Yes, netlist simulation (analog and digital)	No	en, jp	HSPICE, PSPICE, SPICE3, netlists, Images, IBIS, Touchstone	SPICE text file, netlist, BOM, Protel, Accel, OrCad, PADS netlists, Schematic and Analysis Plots Images, Numeric Output Text, Excel	
Micro-Cap (free, end-of-life)	Wine	12.2.0.5	2021-06-17 (end-of-life)	Yes	Yes, netlist simulation (analog and digital)	No	en, jp	HSPICE, PSPICE, SPICE3, netlists, Images, IBIS, Touchstone	SPICE text file, netlist, BOM, Protel, Accel, OrCad, PADS netlists, Schematic and Analysis Plots Images, Numeric Output Text, Excel	
TINA-TI (free)	Windows, Linux, Mac OS, Android	12.0	2019-12	Yes	Yes	No	23 languages (en, de, fr, es, and 19 other languages)	XML, PSpice netlist, (.CIR)	XML, PSpice netlist, (.CIR)	

Of these, LTSpice, TINA-TI, Micro-cap are free proprietary applications based on SPICE. Micro-Cap was released as freeware in July 2019, when its parent company Spectrum Software closed down while LTSpice has been free for a long time.

=== Comparison of proprietary software for PCB design ===
Application and developer	Platform	Latest release		Schematic?	Simulation?	PCB editing?	User Interface Language(s)	Imports	Exports	Scripting support
Application and developer	Platform	Version	Date	Schematic?	Simulation?	PCB editing?	User Interface Language(s)	Imports	Exports	Scripting support
Altium Designer (former Protel) by Altium (included in Altium Develop and Altium Agile)	Windows	24.10.1	2024-10-10	Yes	Yes	Yes	Multilingual	OrCAD, Allegro, PADS Logic, PADS PCB, Expedition, DxDesigner, EAGLE, P-CAD, Gerber, STEP, Solidworks, IDF, Zuken, more	3D PDF, Gerber, Gerber X2, pick-and-place CSV, Excellon, ODB++, IPC-2581, D356, DXF, STEP, Parasolid, EDB, more	Delphi, JS, VB
Altium Designer (former Protel) by Altium (included in Altium Develop and Altium Agile)	Wine	24.10.1	2024-10-10	Yes	Yes	Yes	Multilingual	OrCAD, Allegro, PADS Logic, PADS PCB, Expedition, DxDesigner, EAGLE, P-CAD, Gerber, STEP, Solidworks, IDF, Zuken, more	3D PDF, Gerber, Gerber X2, pick-and-place CSV, Excellon, ODB++, IPC-2581, D356, DXF, STEP, Parasolid, EDB, more	Delphi, JS, VB
CADSTAR, Board Designer, and Visula by Zuken	Windows	2022.0	2022-08-31	Yes	Yes, SI & PI	Yes	en	PADS, OrCAD, P-CAD, Protel, DXF, IDF	PDF, Gerber, Excellon, ODB++, DXF, IDF more	COM, macros
CircuitMaker by Altium	Windows	2	2021-07	Yes	No	Yes	en	Importer Removed since Last Version (1.3)	Gerber, Excellon, DXF, STEP, PDF	None
CircuitMaker by Altium	Wine	2	2021-07	Yes	No	Yes	en	Importer Removed since Last Version (1.3)	Gerber, Excellon, DXF, STEP, PDF	None
CR-5000 by Zuken	POSIX	13	2011-05-17	Yes	Yes, SI & PI	Yes	en, jp	EDIF, DXF, IGES, IDF, BSDL, STEP, ACIS, Gerber, Excellon, more	PDF, Gerber, Excellon, ODB++ (must request), DXF, STEP, IPC D-356, IPC-2581, EPS, ACIS	
CR-5000 by Zuken	Windows	13	2011-05-17	Yes	Yes, SI & PI	Yes	en, jp	EDIF, DXF, IGES, IDF, BSDL, STEP, ACIS, Gerber, Excellon, more	PDF, Gerber, Excellon, ODB++ (must request), DXF, STEP, IPC D-356, IPC-2581, EPS, ACIS	
CR-5000 by Zuken	Unix	13	2011-05-17	Yes	Yes, SI & PI	Yes	en, jp	EDIF, DXF, IGES, IDF, BSDL, STEP, ACIS, Gerber, Excellon, more	PDF, Gerber, Excellon, ODB++ (must request), DXF, STEP, IPC D-356, IPC-2581, EPS, ACIS	
CR-5000 by Zuken	Linux	13	2011-05-17	Yes	Yes, SI & PI	Yes	en, jp	EDIF, DXF, IGES, IDF, BSDL, STEP, ACIS, Gerber, Excellon, more	PDF, Gerber, Excellon, ODB++ (must request), DXF, STEP, IPC D-356, IPC-2581, EPS, ACIS	
CR-8000 by Zuken	POSIX	2020	2020-06-30	Yes	Yes, SI & PI, IBIS-AMI/SERDES	Yes	en, jp	EDIF, DXF, IGES, IDF, BSDL, STEP, ACIS, Gerber, Excellon, more	PDF, Gerber, Excellon, ODB++ (must request), DXF, STEP, IPC D-356, IPC-2581, EPS, ACIS	
CR-8000 by Zuken	Windows	2020	2020-06-30	Yes	Yes, SI & PI, IBIS-AMI/SERDES	Yes	en, jp	EDIF, DXF, IGES, IDF, BSDL, STEP, ACIS, Gerber, Excellon, more	PDF, Gerber, Excellon, ODB++ (must request), DXF, STEP, IPC D-356, IPC-2581, EPS, ACIS	
CR-8000 by Zuken	Unix	2020	2020-06-30	Yes	Yes, SI & PI, IBIS-AMI/SERDES	Yes	en, jp	EDIF, DXF, IGES, IDF, BSDL, STEP, ACIS, Gerber, Excellon, more	PDF, Gerber, Excellon, ODB++ (must request), DXF, STEP, IPC D-356, IPC-2581, EPS, ACIS	
CR-8000 by Zuken	Linux	2020	2020-06-30	Yes	Yes, SI & PI, IBIS-AMI/SERDES	Yes	en, jp	EDIF, DXF, IGES, IDF, BSDL, STEP, ACIS, Gerber, Excellon, more	PDF, Gerber, Excellon, ODB++ (must request), DXF, STEP, IPC D-356, IPC-2581, EPS, ACIS	
DesignSpark PCB by RS Components	Windows	9.0.3	2020-07-08	Yes	Yes, Spice	Yes	en	EAGLE, DXF, EDIF	Gerber, Excellon, ODB++, DXF, IDF, PDF, LPKF	
DipTrace by Novarm	POSIX	5.3.0.3	2026-07-30	Yes	External (Spice netlist export)	Yes	21 languages	Altium, Eagle, KiCad, OrCAD, P-CAD, PADS, Gerber, N/C Drill, DXF, BSDL Pinlist, Netlists	Gerber, Gerber X2, Excellon, ODB++, DXF, Eagle, P-CAD, PADS, OrCAD, IPC-D-356, STEP, VRML, Pick and Place, CSV, BOM	
DipTrace by Novarm	Windows	5.3.0.3	2026-07-30	Yes	External (Spice netlist export)	Yes	21 languages	Altium, Eagle, KiCad, OrCAD, P-CAD, PADS, Gerber, N/C Drill, DXF, BSDL Pinlist, Netlists	Gerber, Gerber X2, Excellon, ODB++, DXF, Eagle, P-CAD, PADS, OrCAD, IPC-D-356, STEP, VRML, Pick and Place, CSV, BOM	
DipTrace by Novarm	Mac	5.3.0.3	2026-07-30	Yes	External (Spice netlist export)	Yes	21 languages	Altium, Eagle, KiCad, OrCAD, P-CAD, PADS, Gerber, N/C Drill, DXF, BSDL Pinlist, Netlists	Gerber, Gerber X2, Excellon, ODB++, DXF, Eagle, P-CAD, PADS, OrCAD, IPC-D-356, STEP, VRML, Pick and Place, CSV, BOM	
DipTrace by Novarm	Wine	5.3.0.3	2026-07-30	Yes	External (Spice netlist export)	Yes	21 languages	Altium, Eagle, KiCad, OrCAD, P-CAD, PADS, Gerber, N/C Drill, DXF, BSDL Pinlist, Netlists	Gerber, Gerber X2, Excellon, ODB++, DXF, Eagle, P-CAD, PADS, OrCAD, IPC-D-356, STEP, VRML, Pick and Place, CSV, BOM	
EAGLE by Autodesk/CadSoft Computer (discontinued)	POSIX	9.6.2	2020-05-27	Yes	Ngspice	Yes	de, en, zh, hu, ru	EAGLE (XML), ACCEL (P-CAD, Altium, Protel), ULTIBOARD, Netlists, BMP, Custom	EAGLE (XML), Protel, Netlists, Images, Gerber, Gerber X2, Excellon, Sieb & Meyer, HPGL, PostScript/EPS, PDF, Images, HyperLynx, IDF, Custom	Proprietary User Language Programming (ULP)
EAGLE by Autodesk/CadSoft Computer (discontinued)	Windows	9.6.2	2020-05-27	Yes	Ngspice	Yes	de, en, zh, hu, ru	EAGLE (XML), ACCEL (P-CAD, Altium, Protel), ULTIBOARD, Netlists, BMP, Custom	EAGLE (XML), Protel, Netlists, Images, Gerber, Gerber X2, Excellon, Sieb & Meyer, HPGL, PostScript/EPS, PDF, Images, HyperLynx, IDF, Custom	Proprietary User Language Programming (ULP)
EAGLE by Autodesk/CadSoft Computer (discontinued)	Linux	9.6.2	2020-05-27	Yes	Ngspice	Yes	de, en, zh, hu, ru	EAGLE (XML), ACCEL (P-CAD, Altium, Protel), ULTIBOARD, Netlists, BMP, Custom	EAGLE (XML), Protel, Netlists, Images, Gerber, Gerber X2, Excellon, Sieb & Meyer, HPGL, PostScript/EPS, PDF, Images, HyperLynx, IDF, Custom	Proprietary User Language Programming (ULP)
EAGLE by Autodesk/CadSoft Computer (discontinued)	Mac	9.6.2	2020-05-27	Yes	Ngspice	Yes	de, en, zh, hu, ru	EAGLE (XML), ACCEL (P-CAD, Altium, Protel), ULTIBOARD, Netlists, BMP, Custom	EAGLE (XML), Protel, Netlists, Images, Gerber, Gerber X2, Excellon, Sieb & Meyer, HPGL, PostScript/EPS, PDF, Images, HyperLynx, IDF, Custom	Proprietary User Language Programming (ULP)
EasyEDA	POSIX	6.4.5	2020-08-19	Yes	Ngspice	Yes	en, fr, de, pl, jp, ru, es, se, ua, zh ...	Altium, EAGLE, KiCad libraries, DipTrace, LTspice .asc/.asy files, JSON, Spice	PDF, PNG, SVG, JSON, Gerber, Excellon, Pick and Place CSV file, CSV-formatted drill chart, Bill of Materials CSV file, Altium netlist, FreePCB netlist, PADS Layout Netlist, Spice netlist.	JSON
EasyEDA	Windows	6.4.5	2020-08-19	Yes	Ngspice	Yes	en, fr, de, pl, jp, ru, es, se, ua, zh ...	Altium, EAGLE, KiCad libraries, DipTrace, LTspice .asc/.asy files, JSON, Spice	PDF, PNG, SVG, JSON, Gerber, Excellon, Pick and Place CSV file, CSV-formatted drill chart, Bill of Materials CSV file, Altium netlist, FreePCB netlist, PADS Layout Netlist, Spice netlist.	JSON
EasyEDA	Linux	6.4.5	2020-08-19	Yes	Ngspice	Yes	en, fr, de, pl, jp, ru, es, se, ua, zh ...	Altium, EAGLE, KiCad libraries, DipTrace, LTspice .asc/.asy files, JSON, Spice	PDF, PNG, SVG, JSON, Gerber, Excellon, Pick and Place CSV file, CSV-formatted drill chart, Bill of Materials CSV file, Altium netlist, FreePCB netlist, PADS Layout Netlist, Spice netlist.	JSON
EasyEDA	Mac	6.4.5	2020-08-19	Yes	Ngspice	Yes	en, fr, de, pl, jp, ru, es, se, ua, zh ...	Altium, EAGLE, KiCad libraries, DipTrace, LTspice .asc/.asy files, JSON, Spice	PDF, PNG, SVG, JSON, Gerber, Excellon, Pick and Place CSV file, CSV-formatted drill chart, Bill of Materials CSV file, Altium netlist, FreePCB netlist, PADS Layout Netlist, Spice netlist.	JSON
EasyEDA	ChromeOS as a Web application	6.4.5	2020-08-19	Yes	Ngspice	Yes	en, fr, de, pl, jp, ru, es, se, ua, zh ...	Altium, EAGLE, KiCad libraries, DipTrace, LTspice .asc/.asy files, JSON, Spice	PDF, PNG, SVG, JSON, Gerber, Excellon, Pick and Place CSV file, CSV-formatted drill chart, Bill of Materials CSV file, Altium netlist, FreePCB netlist, PADS Layout Netlist, Spice netlist.	JSON
Flux.ai	ChromeOS as a Web application	N/A	2025	Yes	Ngspice	Yes	en	EAGLE/KiCad libraries, Altium/Allegro Schematics, DXF, SVG, STEP, etc.	Gerber, IPC-2581C, ODB++, EDIF netlists, D356 netlists, JEP30, Pick and Place CSV file, CSV-formatted drill chart, Bill of Materials CSV file.	TypeScript
NI Ultiboard and Multisim by National Instruments	Windows	14.2	2019-05-19	Yes	Yes	Yes	en	MS*, MP*, EWB, Spice, OrCAD, UltiCap, Protel, Gerber, DXF, Ultiboard 4&5, Calay	BOM, Gerber, Excellon, IGES (3D), DXF (2D & 3D), SVG	
NI Ultiboard and Multisim by National Instruments	Web application	14.2	2019-05-19	Yes	Yes	Yes	en	MS*, MP*, EWB, Spice, OrCAD, UltiCap, Protel, Gerber, DXF, Ultiboard 4&5, Calay	BOM, Gerber, Excellon, IGES (3D), DXF (2D & 3D), SVG	
OrCAD	Windows	17.4 - 22.1	2022-10-20	Yes	Yes	Yes	en	EAGLE, PADS, Altium, STEP, DXF, IDF, IDX, OrCAD SDT, OrCAD Layout,OrCAD	PDF, Gerber, Gerber X2, Excellon drill/route, netlist, ODB++, DXF, IDF, IDX, STEP,3D PDF, IPC2581	Tcl/TK, SKILL (Lisp)
Proteus by Labcenter Electronics Ltd	Windows	8.17	2023-12-11	Yes	Yes	Yes	en	Gerber, BMP, DXF	PDF, Gerber, GerberX2, Excellon, ODB++, DXF, IDF, PKP, testpoint file, metafile, BMP.	internal script
Pulsonix by WestDev Ltd	Windows	12.5	2023	Yes	Yes	Yes	en	Allegro, Altium, CadStar, EAGLE, OrCAD, PADS, P-CAD, Protel, Gerber, STEP, DXF, IDF, more	Gerber, Gerber X2, Excellon, ODB++, IPC-2581, PDF, DXF, STEP, IDF, BOM, more	Proprietary language, ActiveX
Pulsonix by WestDev Ltd	Wine	12.5	2023	Yes	Yes	Yes	en	Allegro, Altium, CadStar, EAGLE, OrCAD, PADS, P-CAD, Protel, Gerber, STEP, DXF, IDF, more	Gerber, Gerber X2, Excellon, ODB++, IPC-2581, PDF, DXF, STEP, IDF, BOM, more	Proprietary language, ActiveX
TARGET 3001!	Windows	33.4	2025-04-09	Yes	Yes	Yes	en, de, fr	EAGLE, DXF, Gerber, Gerber, Excellon, BMP, CXF, STEP 3D	ODB++, Gerber, Gerber X2, Excellon, EAGLE, HPGL, G-Code (Milling), CXF, STEP 3D, Excel BOMs, Pick&Place, GenCAD, FABmaster, IPC D-356, Test points, Netlists, OBJ, POV-Ray, PDF	Package generator scripts, BOM scripts, printing and PDF generator scripts, 3D scripts
TARGET 3001!	Wine	33.4	2025-04-09	Yes	Yes	Yes	en, de, fr	EAGLE, DXF, Gerber, Gerber, Excellon, BMP, CXF, STEP 3D	ODB++, Gerber, Gerber X2, Excellon, EAGLE, HPGL, G-Code (Milling), CXF, STEP 3D, Excel BOMs, Pick&Place, GenCAD, FABmaster, IPC D-356, Test points, Netlists, OBJ, POV-Ray, PDF	Package generator scripts, BOM scripts, printing and PDF generator scripts, 3D scripts
TINA	Windows	12.0	2019-12	Yes	Yes	Yes	23 languages (en, de, fr, es and 19 other languages)	VHDL, Verilog, Verilog-A, and Verilog-AMS	VHDL, Verilog, Verilog-A, and Verilog-AMS	
TINA	Linux	12.0	2019-12	Yes	Yes	Yes	23 languages (en, de, fr, es and 19 other languages)	VHDL, Verilog, Verilog-A, and Verilog-AMS	VHDL, Verilog, Verilog-A, and Verilog-AMS	
TINA	MacOS	12.0	2019-12	Yes	Yes	Yes	23 languages (en, de, fr, es and 19 other languages)	VHDL, Verilog, Verilog-A, and Verilog-AMS	VHDL, Verilog, Verilog-A, and Verilog-AMS	
TINA	Android	12.0	2019-12	Yes	Yes	Yes	23 languages (en, de, fr, es and 19 other languages)	VHDL, Verilog, Verilog-A, and Verilog-AMS	VHDL, Verilog, Verilog-A, and Verilog-AMS	
Upverter	POSIX	N/A	2019-05-10	Yes	No	Yes	en	Altium, PDF, OpenJSON, EAGLE	PDF, Gerber, Excellon, netlist, PADS Layout Netlist, Pick and Place CSV, High-Res PNG, CSV-formatted drill chart, CSV-formatted list of all parts	
Upverter	Windows	N/A	2019-05-10	Yes	No	Yes	en	Altium, PDF, OpenJSON, EAGLE	PDF, Gerber, Excellon, netlist, PADS Layout Netlist, Pick and Place CSV, High-Res PNG, CSV-formatted drill chart, CSV-formatted list of all parts	
Upverter	Web application	N/A	2019-05-10	Yes	No	Yes	en	Altium, PDF, OpenJSON, EAGLE	PDF, Gerber, Excellon, netlist, PADS Layout Netlist, Pick and Place CSV, High-Res PNG, CSV-formatted drill chart, CSV-formatted list of all parts	
123D Circuits by Autodesk	POSIX	N/A		Yes, + breadboard	Yes	Yes	en	EAGLE	Gerber	
123D Circuits by Autodesk	Windows	N/A		Yes, + breadboard	Yes	Yes	en	EAGLE	Gerber	
123D Circuits by Autodesk	Web application	N/A		Yes, + breadboard	Yes	Yes	en	EAGLE	Gerber	
Application and developer	Platform	Latest release		Schematic?	Simulation?	PCB editing?	User Interface Language(s)	Imports	Exports	Scripting support
Application and developer	Platform	Version	Date	Schematic?	Simulation?	PCB editing?	User Interface Language(s)	Imports	Exports	Scripting support

== Free and open-source EDA software ==
Free and open-source software is available for many stages of electronic design automation, including hardware description, simulation, synthesis, physical design, integrated circuit layout, and printed circuit board design.

Examples include the OpenROAD Project for automated integrated-circuit physical design, Chisel for hardware description, Icarus Verilog and Verilator for hardware simulation, Magic and Electric for integrated-circuit layout, Ngspice for circuit simulation, and KiCad and Fritzing for printed circuit board design.

== List by developer ==
List of electrical engineering software
Software	Developer	Operating System/License
Advanced Design System (ADS)	Keysight Technologies	Windows, Linux
Altium Designer (included in Altium Develop and Altium Agile)	Altium Limited	Windows
ANSYS Electronics	ANSYS	Windows, Linux
ANSYS HFSS	ANSYS	Windows
ANSYS Maxwell	ANSYS	Windows, Linux
AutoCAD – Electrical	Autodesk	Windows
CST Studio Suite	Simulia	Windows, Linux
Eagle	Autodesk	Windows, macOS, Linux
EMTP-RV	ATPDraw	Windows
EMTPWorks	EMTPWorks	Windows
Electrical Transient Analyzer Program	ETAP/Operation Technology Inc.	Windows
FreeCAD	FreeCAD Community	Windows, macOS, Linux
FreePCB	FreePCB community	Windows
gEDA	gEDA Project	Windows, macOS, Linux
KTechLab	KTechLab Developers	Windows, macOS, Linux
LibrePCB	LibrePCB Team	Windows, macOS, Linux
Quite Universal Circuit Simulator (QUCS)	Qucs Developers	Windows, macOS, Linux
KiCad	KiCad Developers	Windows, macOS, Linux
LabVIEW	National Instruments	Windows, macOS, Linux
LTspice	Linear Technology	Windows
NI Multisim	National Instruments Electronics Workbench Group	Windows
NL5 circuit simulator	New Wave Instruments	Windows
OrCAD	Cadence Design Systems	Windows
PowerEsim	Power Integrations	Web application
PSIM	Powersim Inc.	Windows
PSpice	Cadence Design Systems	Windows
Power system simulator for engineering	Siemens Energy	Windows
SaberRD	Synopsys	Windows
Simulink	MathWorks	Windows, macOS, Linux
SynchroTrace	Rosh Engineering LLC	Windows
TINA	DesignSoft	Windows
XCircuit	Tim Edwards	Windows, macOS, Linux

- Proprietary
- Open source
- Freeware/Trialware

== Open source software for IC physical synthesis and layout ==
This list does not include schematic editors or simulators since these can generally be used both for Integrated Circuits (ICs) and for Printed Circuit Board (PCB) as long as device models are available.

Name	Architecture	License	Autorouter	Comment
Electric	*BSD, Java	GPL-3.0-or-later	Yes	VLSI circuit design tool with connectivity at all levels. Can also be used for schematic entry and PCB design. In maintenance mode since 2017.
Magic	Linux	BSD license	No	A very-large-scale integration layout tool

== Open source software for schematic editing and analog/mixed-signal simulation ==
Name	Architecture	License	Comment
Gnucap	any (C++11)	GPL-3.0-or-later	Mixed-signal circuit simulator
KTechLab	Linux	GPL	KTechLab is a schematic capture and simulator. It is specifically geared toward mixed signal simulation of analog components and small digital processors.
Ngspice	Linux, Solaris, Mac, NetBSD, FreeBSD, Windows	BSD-3-Clause	SPICE + XSPICE + Cider
Oregano		GPL-2.0-or-later	Schematic capture + spice simulation
Quite Universal Circuit Simulator (QUCS)	Linux, Solaris, Mac, NetBSD, FreeBSD, Windows	GPL-2.0-or-later	Schematic capture + Verilog + VHDL + simulation. Qucs-S fork supports SPICE backends Ngspice, Xyce, & SpiceOpus.
XCircuit	Unix	GPL	Used to produce netlists and publish high-quality drawings.

=== Open source software for PCB design ===
Name	Architecture	License	Autorouter	Imports	Exports	Scripting support	Comment
atopile	Linux, Mac, Windows	MIT License	No	—	Gerber, BOM	Python	Code-based EDA tool that allows hardware engineers to design electronic circuits and PCBs using a programming-like environment. It integrates hardware design specifications directly into code, enabling intelligent design capture, version control, and continuous integration practices.
FreePCB	Windows	GPL	Yes	—	Gerber	No	A printed circuit board design program for Microsoft Windows. FreePCB allows for up to 16 copper layers, both metric and US customary units, and export of designs in Gerber format. Boards can be partially or fully autorouted with the FreeRouting autorouter by using the FpcROUTE Specctra DSN design file translator.
Fritzing	Windows, Mac, Linux	GPL-3.0-or-later	Yes	gEDA symbols, KiCad symbols, SVG	Gerber, DIY etching, BOM, SVG, PDF, EPS	No	Protoboard view, schematic view, PCB view, Code (firmware) view. Includes customizable design rule checker. Includes common shaped boards like Arduino and Raspberry Pi shields. Allows spline curve traces. Only two layers (top and bottom). Outputs gerbers.
gEDA	*BSD, Linux, Mac	GPL-2.0-or-later	Yes	gschem netlists, image as background	Gerber, Excellon, SVG, PDF, EPS, PNG, GIF, JPEG, Specctra, XYRS	Guile (Scheme)	Schematic, simulation, PCB editor, gerber view
KiCad	Linux, Mac, Windows	GPL-3.0-or-later	FreeRouting	Altium, CadStar, EAGLE (XML), P-CAD, Fabmaster, TinyCAD net lists, OrCAD EDIF	PDF, Gerber, Gerber X2, Excellon, netlist, VRML2, STEP, IDFv3	Python	Full package for schematic and board design, etc. Design rule checking. User-defined symbols and footprints. Gerber/drill file creation. Graphic interface. Active user community.
pcb-rnd	*BSD, Linux, Mac, Windows	GPL-2.0-or-later	Yes	gschem netlists, Protel Autotrax, KiCad (legacy & s-expr layouts), EAGLE (XML & v3,4,5 binary layouts), eeschema netlists, mentor netlists, TinyCad netlists, Calay netlist, FreePCB/easyEDA netlist, LT-Spice, MUCS, Mentor Graphics Hyperlynx, image (BMP, JPG, GIF, PNG), HPGL, BXL, Specctra (DSN), PADS	Gerber/drill, SVG, PDF, EPS, PNG, GIF, JPEG, Specctra (DSN), PADS, Protel Autotrax, KiCad (legacy & s-expr), DXF, FidocadJ, Mentor Graphics Hyperlynx, template configurable XYRS/BOM	Python, Lua, Perl, Tcl, AWK (multiple dialects), Lisp & Scheme (multiple dialects), JavaScript, Ruby, Pascal, BASIC	Circuit layout program with extended file format support, DRC, parametric footprints, query language, and GUI and command line operation for batch processing and automation
tscircuit	*BSD, Linux, Mac, Windows, Web Application	MIT License	Yes	KiCad	SVG, Gerber, KiCad, BOM	Javascript	Typescript-based framework for creating printed circuit boards with TSX code and a built-in autorouter

== See also ==
- Comparison of instruction set architectures
- Electronic design automation (EDA)
- List of EDA companies
- List of computer-aided engineering software
- List of finite element software packages
- List of free electronics circuit simulators
- List of numerical analysis software
- List of semiconductor occupations
- List of software engineering topics
- OpenRISC - open source microprocessor development
- Power engineering software
- Schematic editor
- SPICE, a general purpose analog circuit simulator.
- TopoR
