= FreePCB =

Printed circuit board design program for Microsoft Windows

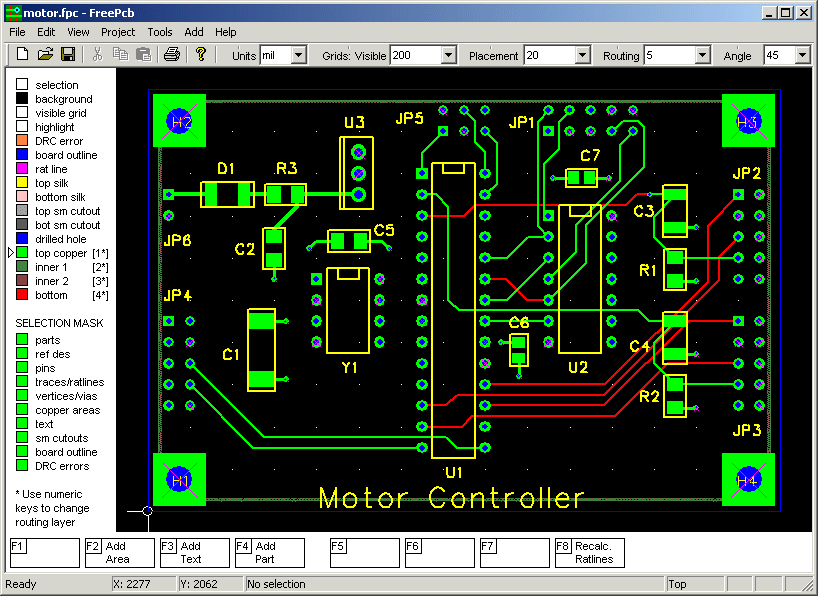
- Using FreePCB to design a motor controller.
- Original author: Allan Wright
- Release: 2003; 23 years ago
- Stable release: 1.359 / 11 September 2010; 16 years ago
- Written in: C++
- Operating system: Microsoft Windows
- Platform: IA-32, x86-64
- Available in: English
- Type: EDA
- License: GNU General Public License
- Website: www.freepcb.com

FreePCB is a printed circuit board (PCB) electronic design automation program for Microsoft Windows, written by Allan Wright. It is free and open-source software released under a GNU General Public License.

== Features ==
The program supports up to 16 copper layers, both metric and customary units, and export of designs in RS-274X Gerber format. Boards can be partly or fully autorouted with the FreeRouting autorouter by using the FpcROUTE Specctra DSN design file translator.

== Other operating systems ==
FreePCB can run on Linux by using Wine and on Mac computers using Parallels Desktop for Mac, Virtual Box, or Wine via MacPorts.

== See also ==
- Comparison of EDA software
- List of free electronics circuit simulators
