= GNU Circuit Analysis Package =

- Other names: Gnucap
- Original author(s): Albert Davis
- Preview release: 0.35 / 20 September 2006; 18 years ago
- Repository: git.savannah.gnu.org/cgit/gnucap.git
- License: GPL-2.0-or-later
- Website: www.gnu.org/software/gnucap/gnucap.html

GNU Circuit Analysis Package (Gnucap) is a general purpose circuit simulator started by Albert Davis in 1993. It is part of the GNU Project. The latest stable version is 0.35 from 2006. The latest development snapshot (as of July 2023) is from June 2023 and is usable.

It performs nonlinear DC and transient analysis, Fourier analysis, and AC analysis linearized at an operating point. It is fully interactive and command driven. It can also be run in batch mode or as a server. The output is produced as it simulates.

With grant funding from Nlnet, the Gnucap project started to implement a first free/libre simulator with Verilog-AMS capabilities. As of July 2023 the model generator covers most of the analog subset and effectively replaces ADMS.

== See also ==
- Comparison of EDA Software
- List of free electronics circuit simulators
