= KTechLab =

Open-source IDE for circuit design and simulation

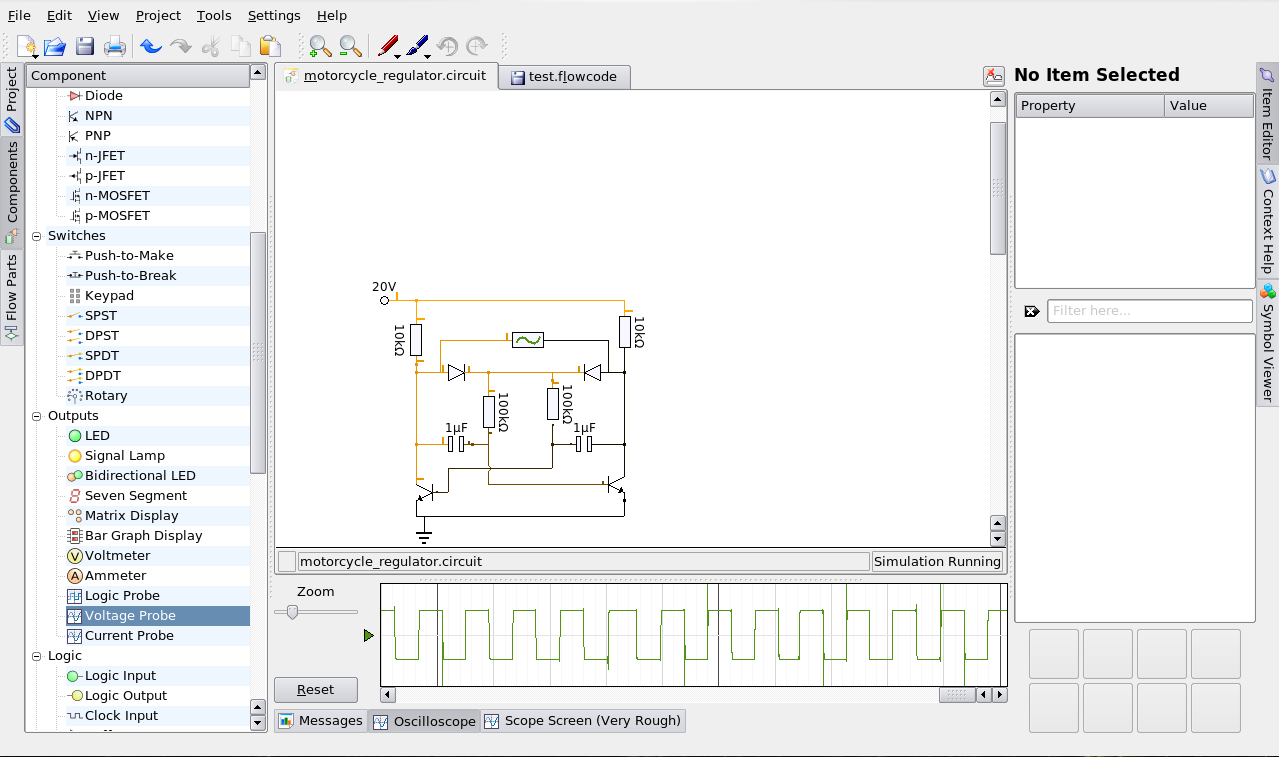
- KTechLab V0.3.7 running on Linux
- Original author: David Saxton
- Stable release: 0.50.0 / September 20, 2020; 5 years ago
- Repository: invent.kde.org/sdk/ktechlab
- Written in: C++
- Operating system: Linux
- Platform: KDE
- Type: Electronic design automation
- License: GNU General Public License

KTechLab is an IDE for electronic and PIC microcontroller circuit design and simulation; it is a circuit designer with auto-routing and a simulator of common electronic components and logic elements.

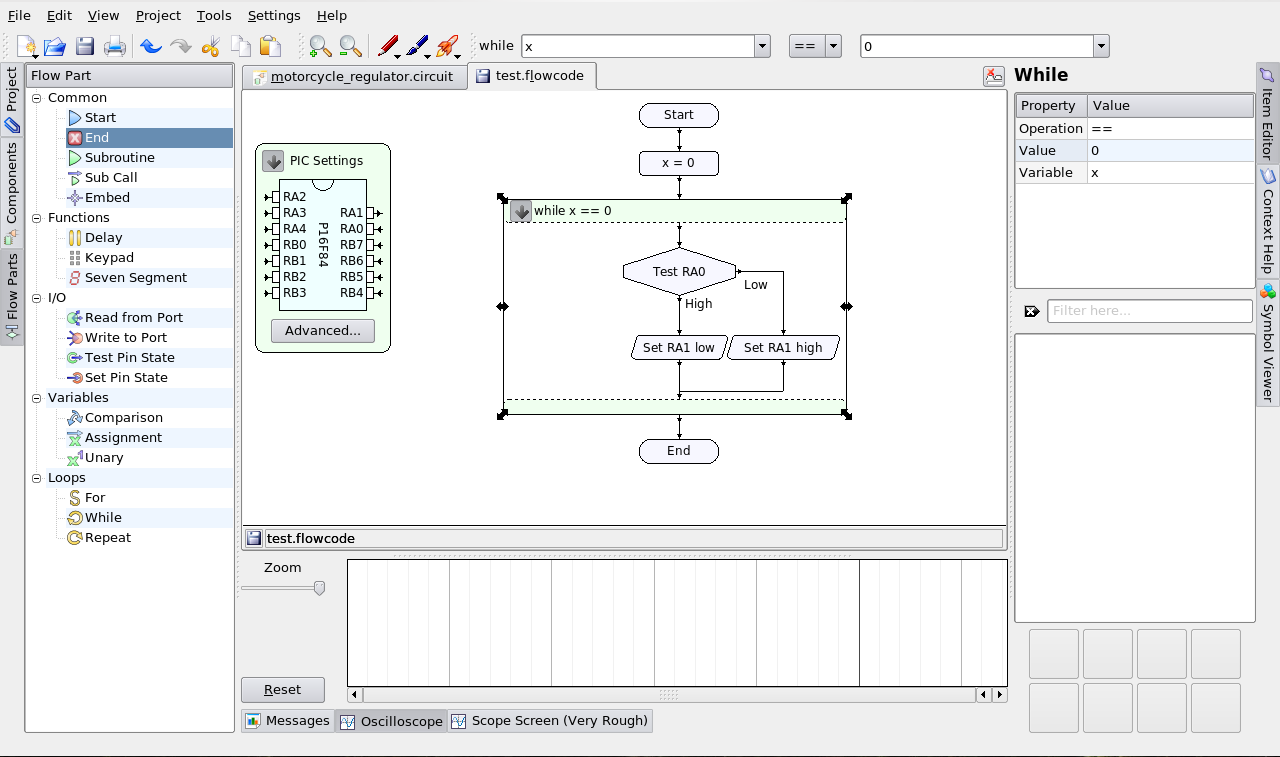
KTechLab supports programming microcontrollers using a graphical flowchart based language called flowcode.

KTechLab is free and open-source software licensed under the terms of the GNU GPL.

== History ==
KTechLab was first developed by David Saxton, who worked on it until 2007. The design ideas and a lot of the current code have been developed by him. He released various versions, up to version 0.3.6.

When David Saxton stated that he would not be able to continue developing the software, KTechLab stalled for a while before others continued his work, releasing version 0.3.7, with more components and bug fixes.

In January 2019, KTechLab was ported to Qt and KDELibs4. The new priority changed to port KTechLab to Qt5 and KF5, accomplished by version 0.50.0.

== See also ==
- Comparison of EDA software
- List of free electronics circuit simulators
