= Power system simulator for engineering =

Software tool

Power System Simulator for Engineering (PSS®E—often written as PSS/E) is a software tool used by power system engineers to simulate electrical power transmission networks in steady-state conditions as well as over timescales of a few seconds to tens of seconds.

Since its introduction in 1976, it has evolved from a simple command-line interface, to an integrated, interactive program for simulating, analyzing, and optimizing power system performance, and it can provide probabilistic and dynamic modeling features.
