= TINA (software) =

Electronics design and training software

- Original author: DesignSoft
- Developer: DesignSoft
- Release: January 1990; 36 years ago
- Stable release: v14 / December 2022
- Operating system: Windows XP, Windows Vista, Windows 7, Windows 8, Windows 10
- Platform: Microsoft Windows macOS and Linux: runs through Wine Online versions: run in browsers under: Windows, macOS, Android, iOS, on PC, Mac, tablet, and smartphones
- Available in: 23 languages (English, German, French, Spanish and 19 other languages)
- License: Proprietary
- Website: www.tina.com

Toolkit for Interactive Network Analysis (TINA) is a SPICE-based electronics design and training software by DesignSoft of Budapest. Its features include analog, digital, and mixed circuit simulations, and printed circuit board (PCB) design.

== History ==
TINA was created and developed by DesignSoft, a Hungarian company in Budapest. The first Windows version was released in 1993 as TINA 4.0 for analog, digital, and mixed circuits. TINA 9.0 also includes microcontroller (MCU) simulation, RF network analysis, optimization, and printed circuit board design. TINA development was at version 10, released in 2013, and is at major version 11 since 2016. Since 2004, TINA-TI is a free limited version for the support of integrated circuits and applications licensed by Texas Instruments.

== Versions ==
TINA software is available in installable and cloud-based versions. Feature versions exist for use in industry and for educational use. TINA allows simulation, design, and real-time testing of hardware description language (HDL), such as VHDL, VHDL-AMS, Verilog, Verilog-A, Verilog-AMS, SystemVerilog and SystemC and for microcontroller (MCU) circuits, as well as mixed electronic circuits including switched-mode power supply, RF, communication, and optoelectronics circuits. With the integrated and third-party flowchart tools, generation and debugging of MCU code is also possible both in digital and mixed circuit environments. TINA Design Suite includes an integrated layout module for designing multilayer PCB's with split power plane layers, auto-placement & auto-routing, rip-up and reroute, manual and "follow-me" trace placement, DRC, forward and back annotation, pin and gate swapping, keep-in and keep-out areas, copper pour, thermal relief, fan-out, 3D view of the PCB design, Gerber file, and CNC (G-code) output.

TINA is available on many platforms with multiple versions of the software including TINA-TI, a complimentary limited version of TINA for the support of TI integrated circuits and applications licensed by Texas Instruments since 2004.

TINACloud is the cloud based, multi-language, online version of TINA. It is running in main browsers without installation through the Internet. TINACloud runs on most operating systems and computers. Since 2014, TINACloud is also used by Infineon Technologies as the engine of Infineon Designer for online prototyping with A/D simulation.

== Awards ==
- 2006: TINA 7 Design Suite: Worlddidac Award, Worlddidac Association
- 2014: TINACloud: Worlddidac Award, Worlddidac Association
