= List of free electronics circuit simulators =

List of free analog and digital electronic circuit simulators, available for Windows, macOS, Linux, and comparing against UC Berkeley SPICE. The following table is split into two groups based on whether it has a graphical visual interface or not. The latter requires a separate program to provide that feature, such as Qucs-S, Oregano, or a schematic design application that supports external simulators, such as KiCad or gEDA.

Simulator name	Business or developer	Latest release year	Currently developed?	Source code?	Operating system platforms	Analog?	Digital?	Digital languages?	Visual editor?	Notes
KTechLab	n/a	2020	Yes	Yes	Linux	Yes	Yes	No	Yes	Simulates a PIC microcontroller
Logisim-evolution	Multiple universities	2025	Yes	Yes	Windows, macOS, Linux	No	Yes	VHDL	Yes	Fork of Logisim (development ended in 2011)
LTspice	Analog Devices	2026	Yes	No	Windows, macOS, POL	Yes	No	No	Yes	Very popular, updated often Originally created at Linear Technology.
Micro-Cap	Spectrum Software	2021	No	No	Windows	Yes	Yes	PLD expressions	Yes	End-of-life, no longer updated; was commercial software
QSPICE	Qorvo	2026	Yes	No	Windows	Yes	Yes	Verilog	Yes	Integrated support for digital blocks, C++, Verilog; author same as LTspice
Qucs	n/a	2017	?	Yes	Windows, macOS, Linux	Yes	Yes	VHDL, Verilog (only pure digital simulations)	Yes	Qt GUI; uses own SPICE-incompatible simulator Qucsator for analog
Qucs-S	various contributors	2025	Yes	Yes	Windows, Linux, macOS	Yes	Yes	VHDL, Verilog (only pure digital simulations)	Yes	Fork of Qucs that supports SPICE-compatible simulator backends: Ngspice, Xyce, SpiceOpus, Qucsator
InfineonSpice	Infineon Technologies	2024	Yes	No	Windows, Wine	Yes	No	No	Yes	Analog SPICE Simulation
SapWin	University of Florence	2019	?	No	Windows	Yes	No	No	Yes	A serial number is sent to email to activate
Tinkercad Circuits	Autodesk	2013	Yes	No	Web-based	Yes	Yes	Arduino (via block or text code)	Yes	Beginner-friendly; simulates Arduino and basic electronics
TINA–TI	DesignSoft & TI	2018	Yes	No	Windows, Wine	Yes	No	No	Yes	Special version of TINA licensed to TI
PSPICE-FOR-TI	Cadence & TI	2023	Yes	No	Windows	Yes	No	No	Yes	Special version of PSpice licensed to TI
Gnucap	n/a	2006	?	Yes	Linux	Yes	No	No	No	SPICE, Verilog, Spectre netlists; plug-ins
Ngspice	n/a	2025	Yes	Yes	Windows, macOS, Linux	Yes	Yes	*	No	Backend simulator for Altium Designer, Eagle, KiCad, Qucs-S
SPICE	UC Berkeley	1993	No	Yes	Source-only	Yes	No	No	No	End-of-life, no longer updated; historically important, because many analog simulators are based on this project
Xyce	Sandia National Laboratories	2025	Yes	Yes	Windows, macOS, Linux	Yes	*	*	No	Backend simulator, supports parallel simulation on Linux and macOS, can solve huge circuits

Table notes

- ngspice - loads Verilog digital code compiled by Verilator or Icarus Verilog or VHDL compiled by GHDL for mixed signal simulation
- Xyce - limited experimental support for Verilog and VHDL

== See also ==
- List of HDL simulators for VHDL, Verilog, SystemVerilog, ...
- Espresso heuristic logic minimizer, such as Logic Friday
- Electronic kit
- Comparison of EDA software
- List of instruction set simulators
- List of electrical engineering software
- List of free and open-source EDA software
