= Specctra =

Commercial auto-router

Specctra / Allegro PCB Router
- Original authors: Cooper & Chyan Technology, Inc.
- Developer: Cadence Design Systems
- Release: 1989
- Stable release: 17.4 – 22.1 / 20 October 2022
- Operating system: Unix, Windows
- Type: САD
- License: Proprietary
- Website: http://www.cadence.com/

Specctra is a commercial PCB auto-router originally developed by John F. Cooper and David Chyan of Cooper & Chyan Technology, Inc. (CCT) in 1989. The company and product were taken over by Cadence Design Systems in May 1997. Since its integration into Cadence's Allegro PCB Editor, the name of the router is Allegro PCB Router. The latest version is 17.4 – 22.1 (20 October 2022).

Specctra routes boards by presenting graphical data using a "shape-based" technology which represents graphical objects not as a set of points-coordinates but more compact. This increases the efficiency of routing printed circuit boards with a high density of components, provides automatic routing of the same chain of tracks of different widths, and more.

Specctra uses adaptive algorithms implemented in multiple trace runs. The routing is carried out in three stages:

1. preview routing
2. autoroute
3. additional processing of autoroute results

On the first pass, the connection of all conductors is performed, regardless of the presence of conflicts, which consist in crossing the conductors on one layer and breaking the gaps. On each subsequent pass, the auto-router tries to reduce the number of conflicts by breaking and re-building connections (the ripup-and-retry router method) and pushing the conductors by pushing the neighboring ones (the push-and-shove router method). Electromagnetic compatibility can be tested in Specctra through the "SPECCTRAQuest SI Expert" module.

The program is compatible with many design systems for printed circuit boards, thanks to the use of industrial-standard DSN design file format for project description and Do-files to specify routing strategies. The results are returned to the board editor via SES session files as well as RTE files. Protocol command execution is recorded in Did-file, which after editing can be used as new Do-files.

The DSN/SES file formats are also supported by a number of other auto-routers including KONEKT ELECTRA, Eremex TopoR, Alfons Wirtz's FreeRouting and RL-based DeepPCB.

== List of EDA tools supporting Specctra ==
- ACCEL PCB
- Cadence Allegro
- Cadnetix
- CADVANCE V / α
- DK-/DK-Magic
- DREAM CAD
- EAGLE (via BRD_TO_DSN.ULP etc.)
- Easy-PC (via an optional interface)
- KiCad
- Mentor BoardStation
- MyPCB
- OrCAD Layout
- PADS Perform / PowerPCB
- PLANET
- PLASMA
- Protel Advanced PCB
- Providence
- SCS-1
- TARGET 3001!
- U-Art
- ULTIboard
- Vanguard PCB
- Zuken CR-3000 / CR-5000
- Zuken Visula / Zuken CadStar

== See also ==
- OrCAD
- Proteus
- P-CAD
