= V9 =

V9 or V09 may refer to:

== Transportation ==
- Fokker V.9, an experimental aircraft part of a series which led up to the low-production D.VI fighter
- USS V-9 or USS Cuttlefish (SS-171), a Cachalot-class submarine
- Hughes XV-9, a 1960s American experimental helicopter
- V9 Overstreet, a road in Milton Keynes, England
- BAL Bashkirian Airlines (IATA code)
- Škoda-Kauba V9, a Czechoslovak aircraft
- Luxeed V9, a Chinese range-extended full-size luxury minivan
- Arcfox Wendao V9, a Chinese range-extended full-size minivan
- Forthing Xinghai V9, a Chinese plug-in hybrid minivan

== Science and technology ==
- Vivo V9, a smartphone by Vivo
- ATC code V09 (diagnostic radiopharmaceuticals), a subgroup of the Anatomical Therapeutic Chemical Classification System
- RAZR V9, a cell phone by Motorola
- SPARC V9, a 64-bit SPARC architecture
- V9 Unix or Version 9 Unix, a version of the Research Unix operating system developed and used internally at the Bell Labs
- Huawei Honor V9, a smartphone made by Huawei under their Honor sub-brand
- TARGET V9, a CAD computer program for EDA and PCB design, developed by Ing.-Büro Friedrich in Germany

== Other uses ==
- V9, a grade in climbing
- V9, a grade in bouldering
- 9V (disambiguation)
