= Maze runner (disambiguation) =

Maze runner is a routing method in electronic design automation.

Maze Runner or The Maze Runner may also refer to:

- The Maze Runner (novel series), a young-adult post-apocalyptic dystopian science fiction series of novels
  - The Maze Runner, the first book in the series
- Maze Runner (film series), a series of film adaptations of the Maze Runner book series
  - The Maze Runner (film), the first film in the film adaptation series
  - Maze Runner: The Scorch Trials, the second film in the film adaptation series
  - Maze Runner: The Death Cure, the third and final film in the film adaptation series
