= C. Y. Lee =

C. Y. Lee may refer to:

- Chin Yang Lee (1915–2018), Chinese-American writer
- Chu-Yuan Lee (born 1938), Taiwanese architect
- Lee Chung-yong (born 1988), South Korean footballer
- C. Y. Lee, inventor of the Lee algorithm
