= CR-8000 =

CR-8000 is a EDA suite launched by Japanese EDA vendor Zuken in 2011. Developed to serve the needs of multi-board level design CR-8000 is a next generation replacement for CR-5000 that was originally focused on single-board design. CR-8000 makes use of new technology including the integration of a tablet as an input device and the use of native 3D layout and actual 64-bit architecture. The CR-8000 family features four modules – System Planner; Design Gateway; Design Force; and DFM Center. These modules cover initial system planning, detailed schematic and pcb design; and optimized manufacturing output.

== Tools ==
- System Planner: A system-level design environment for upfront planning and partitioning of electronics systems.
- Design Gateway: Platform for logical circuit design and verification of single and multi-board system-level electronic designs.
- Design Force: A complete system on package and board design and analysis solution.
- DFM Center: A manufacturing preparation and output solution supporting panelization and common output formats

== See also ==
- CR-2000
- CR-3000
- Printed Circuit Board
- Cadstar
