= Circuit design =

Engineering process

In electrical engineering, the process of circuit design can cover systems ranging from complex electronic systems down to the individual transistors within an integrated circuit. One person can often do the design process without needing a planned or structured design process for simple circuits. Still, teams of designers following a systematic approach with intelligently guided computer simulation are becoming increasingly common for more complex designs. In integrated circuit design automation, the term "circuit design" often refers to the step of the design cycle which outputs the schematics of the integrated circuit. Typically this is the step between logic design and physical design.

== Process ==
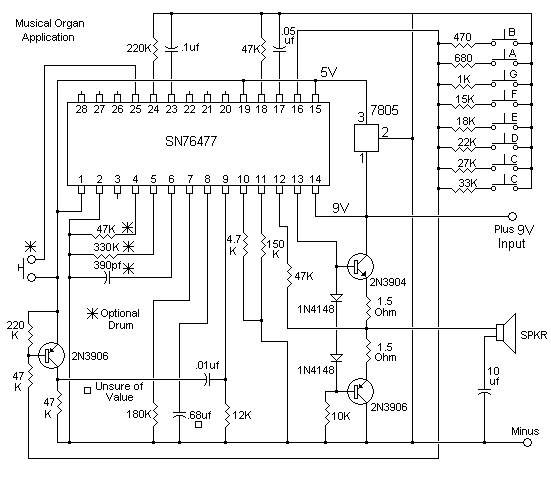
A circuit diagram for an application of Texas Instruments SN76477 sound chip

Traditional circuit design usually involves several stages. Sometimes, a design specification is written after liaising with the customer. A technical proposal may be written to meet the requirements of the customer specification. The next stage involves synthesising on paper a schematic circuit diagram, an abstract electrical or electronic circuit that will meet the specifications. A calculation of the component values to meet the operating specifications under specified conditions should be made. Simulations may be performed to verify the correctness of the design.

A breadboard or other prototype version of the design for testing against specification may be built. It may involve making any alterations to the circuit to achieve compliance. A choice as to a method of construction and all the parts and materials to be used must be made. There is a presentation of component and layout information to draughtspersons and layout and mechanical engineers for prototype production. This is followed by the testing or type-testing several prototypes to ensure compliance with customer requirements. Usually, there is a signing and approval of the final manufacturing drawings, and there may be post-design services (obsolescence of components, etc.).

== Specification ==
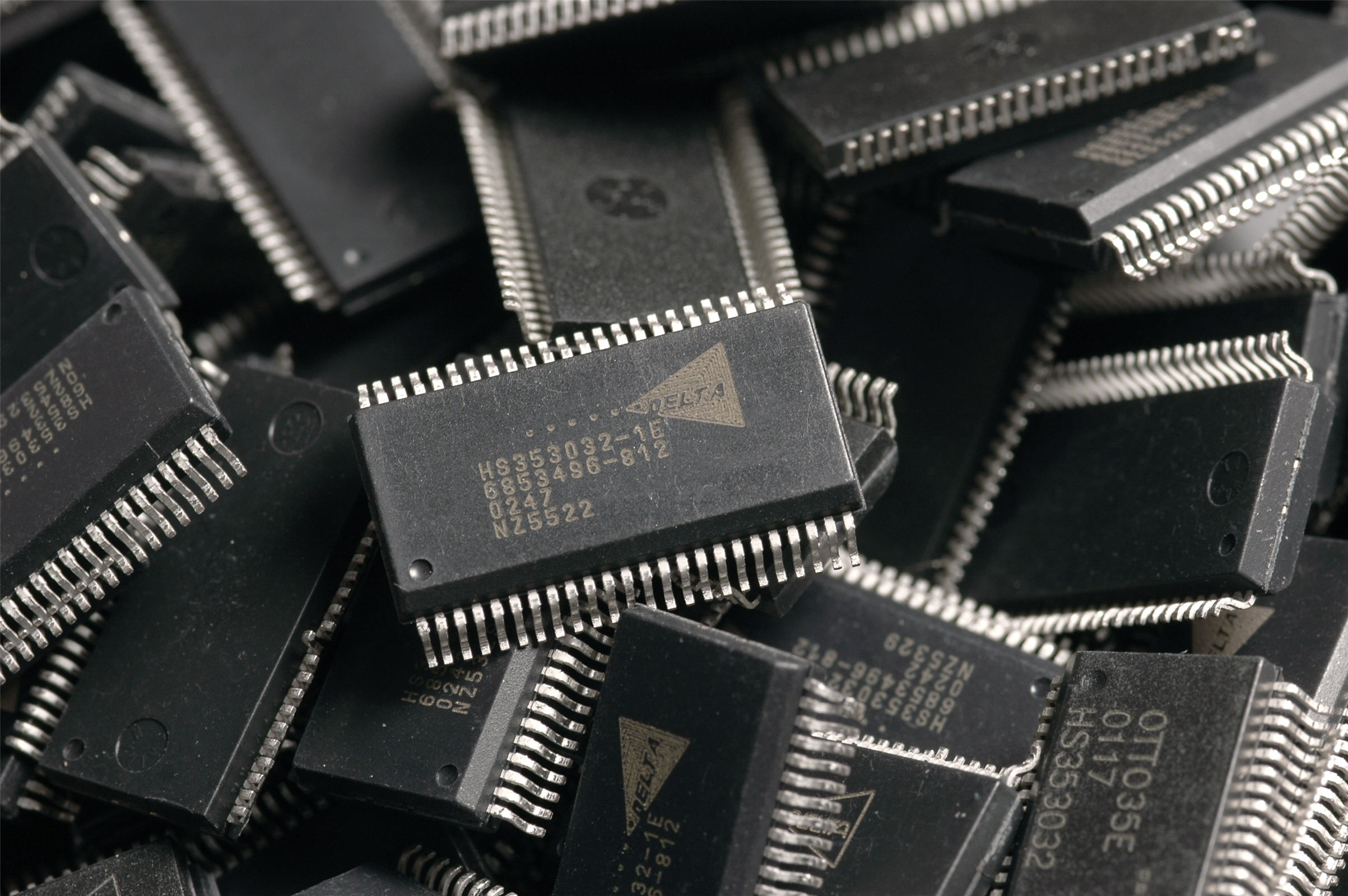
Microchips

The process of circuit design begins with the specification, which states the functionality that the finished design must provide but does not indicate how it is to be achieved . The initial specification is a technically detailed description of what the customer wants the finished circuit to achieve and can include a variety of electrical requirements, such as what signals the circuit will receive, what signals it must output, what power supplies are available and how much power it is permitted to consume. The specification can (and normally does) also set some of the physical parameters that the design must meet, such as size, weight, moisture resistance, temperature range, thermal output, vibration tolerance, and acceleration tolerance.

As the design process progresses, the designer(s) will frequently return to the specification and alter it to take account of the progress of the design. This can involve tightening specifications that the customer has supplied and adding tests that the circuit must pass to be accepted. These additional specifications will often be used in the verification of a design. Changes that conflict with or modify the customer's original specifications will almost always have to be approved by the customer before they can be acted upon.

Correctly identifying the customer needs can avoid a condition known as 'design creep', which occurs in the absence of realistic initial expectations, and later by failing to communicate fully with the client during the design process. It can be defined in terms of its results; "at one extreme is a circuit with more functionality than necessary, and at the other is a circuit having an incorrect functionality". Nevertheless, some changes can be expected. It is good practice to keep options open for as long as possible because it's easier to remove spare elements from the circuit later on than it is to put them in.

== Design ==
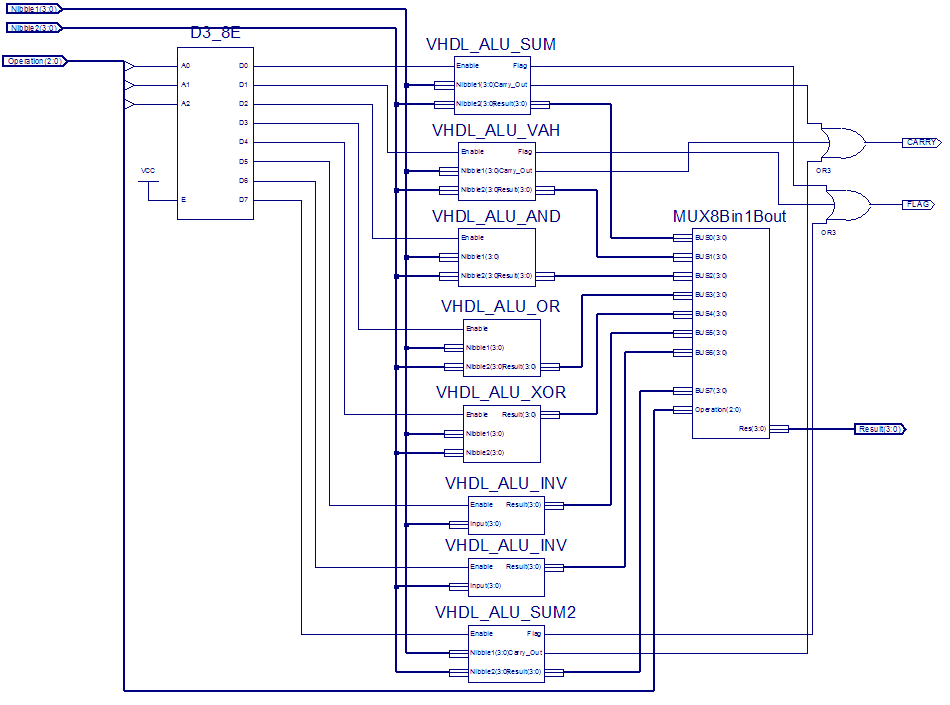
A block diagram of 4-bit ALU

The design process involves moving from the specification at the start to a plan that contains all the information needed to be physically constructed at the end; this happens typically by passing through several stages, although in the straightforward circuit, it may be done in a single step. The process usually begins with the conversion of the specification into a block diagram of the various functions that the circuit must perform, at this stage the contents of each block are not considered, only what each block must do, this is sometimes referred to as a "black box" design. This approach allows the possibly highly complex task to be broken into smaller tasks either by tackled in sequence or divided amongst members of a design team.

Each block is then considered in more detail, still at an abstract stage, but with a lot more focus on the details of the electrical functions to be provided. At this or later stages, it is common to require a large amount of research or mathematical modeling into what is and is not feasible to achieve. The results of this research may be fed back into earlier stages of the design process, for example if it turns out one of the blocks cannot be designed within the parameters set for it, it may be necessary to alter other blocks instead. At this point, it is also common to start considering both how to demonstrate that the design does meet the specifications, and how it is to be tested ( which can include self diagnostic tools ).

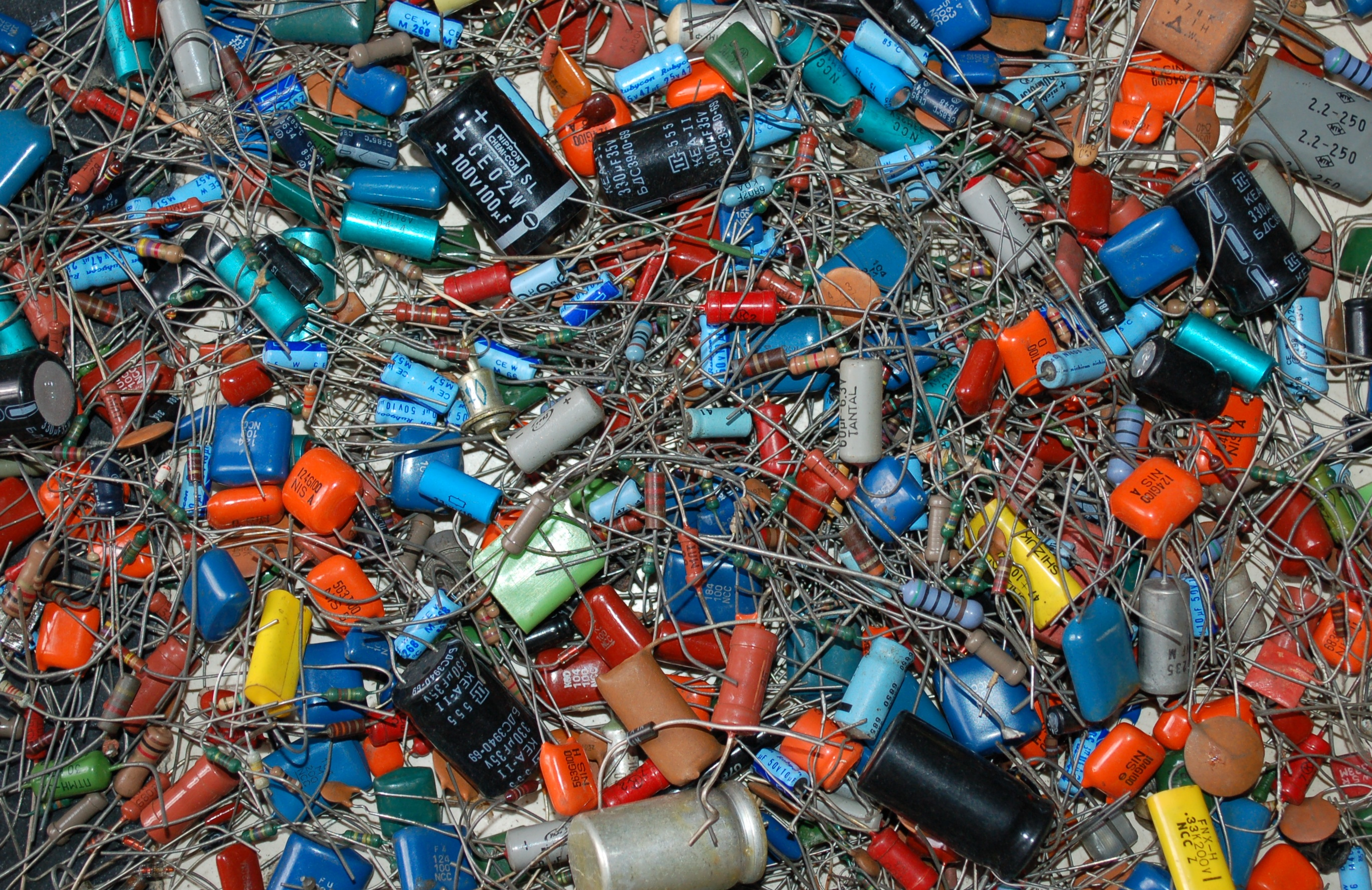
Individual circuit components

Finally, the individual circuit components are chosen to carry out each function in the overall design; at this stage, the physical layout and electrical connections of each component are also decided, this layout commonly taking the form of artwork for the production of a printed circuit board or Integrated circuit. This stage is typically highly time-consuming because of the vast array of choices available. A practical constraint on the design at this stage is standardization;. At the same time, a certain value of a component may be calculated for use in some location in a circuit; if that value cannot be purchased from a supplier, then the problem has still not been solved. To avoid this, a certain amount of 'catalog engineering' can be applied to solve the more mundane tasks within an overall design.

In general, the circuit principles of design flow are including but not limited to architecture scope definition, materials selection, schematic capture, PCB layout design that include power and signal integrity considition, test and validation.

=== Costs ===
Comparison chart between field-effect transistors.

Generally, the cost of designing circuits is directly tied to the final circuits' complexity. The greater the complexity (quantity of components and design novelty), the more hours of a skilled engineer's time will be necessary to create a functional product. The process can be tedious, as minute details or features could take any amount of time, materials and manpower to create. Like taking into account the effects of modifying transistor sizes or codecs. In the world of flexible electronics, replacing the, widely used, polyimide substrates with materials like PEN or PET to produce flexible electronics, could reduce costs by factors of 5-10.

Costs for designing a circuit are almost always far higher than production costs per unit, as the cost of production and function of the circuit depends greatly on the design of the circuit.

Although the typical PCB production methods involve subtractive manufacturing, there are methods that use an additive manufacturing process, such as using a 3D printer to "print" a PCB. This method is thought to cost less than additive manufacturing and eliminates the need for waste management altogether.

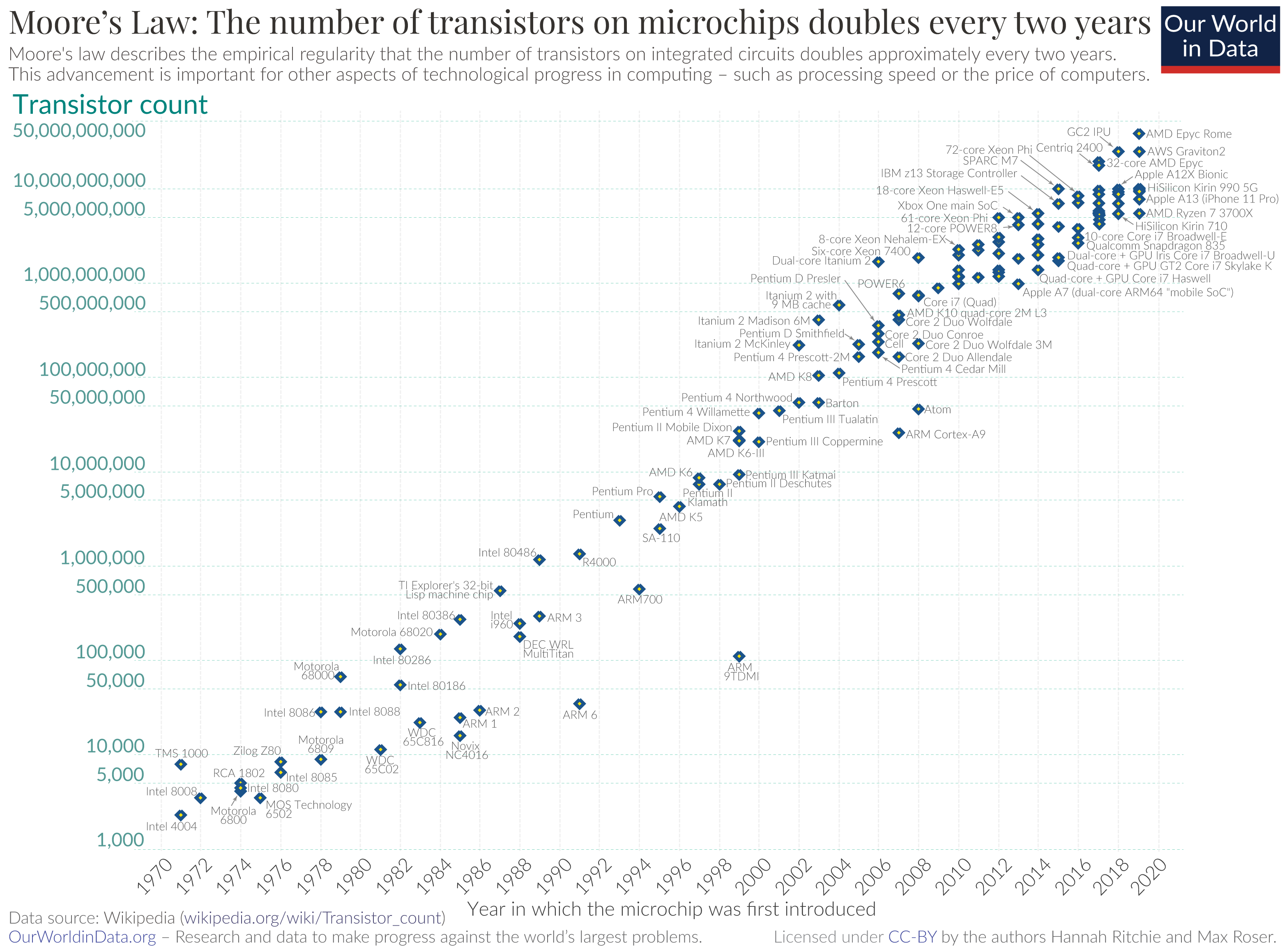
A graph of the growing number of transistors on circuits each year, otherwise known as Moore's Law

== Verification and testing ==
Once a circuit has been designed, it must be both verified and tested. Verification is the process of going through each stage of a design and ensuring that it will do what the specification requires it to do. This is frequently a highly mathematical process and can involve large-scale computer simulations of the design. In any complicated design, it is very likely that problems will be found at this stage and may affect a large amount of the design work to be redone to fix them.

Testing is the real-world counterpart to verification; testing involves physically building at least a prototype of the design and then (in combination with the test procedures in the specification or added to it) checking the circuit does what it was designed to.

== Prototyping ==
Prototyping plays a significant role in the complex process of circuit design. This iterative process involves continuous refinement and correction of errors. The task of circuit design is demanding and requires meticulous attention to detail to avoid errors. Circuit designers are required to conduct multiple tests to ensure the efficiency and safety of their designs before they are deemed suitable for consumer use.

Prototyping is an integral part of electrical work due to its precise and meticulous nature. The absence of prototyping could potentially lead to errors in the final product. Circuit designers, who are compensated for their expertise in creating electrical circuits, bear the responsibility of ensuring the safety of consumers who purchase and use these circuits at home.

The risks associated with neglecting the prototyping process and releasing a flawed electrical circuit are significant. These risks include the potential for fires and overheated wires, which could result in burns or severe injuries to unsuspecting individuals.

== Results ==
Every electrical circuit starts with a circuit board simulator to show how the circuit will be assembled and how the circuit will work virtually. A blueprint is the drawing of the technical design and final product. Using a circuit board simulator and blueprint, circuit designers can design and build complete circuits. Designing circuits takes time and skill, but circuits run many objects from everyday live from modern household appliance to advanced robotic systems.

=== Documentation ===
Any commercial design will normally also include an element of documentation; the precise nature of this documentation will vary according to the size and complexity of the circuit and the country in which it is to be used. As a bare minimum, the documentation will normally include at least the specification and testing procedures for the design and a statement of compliance with current regulations. In the EU this last item will normally take the form of a CE Declaration listing the European directives complied with and naming an individual responsible for compliance.

== Software ==
- Altium Designer
- EasyEDA
- gEDA
- pcb-rnd
- KiCad
- OrCAD
- NI Multisim
- SPICE

== See also ==
- Advanced Design System
- Circuit design language
- Configuration design
- Electrical system design
- Electronic circuit design
- Electronic design automation
- Espresso heuristic logic minimizer
- GDSII
- Integrated circuit design
- List of EDA companies
- List of semiconductor occupations
- Mesh analysis
- Open Artwork System Interchange Standard
