= Cadsoft =

Cadsoft may refer to:

- CadSoft Computer GmbH, a German software house and developer of the PCB design tool EAGLE, meanwhile a subsidiary of Autodesk
- CadSoft Computer Inc., a US-based subsidiary of CadSoft Computer GmbH, meanwhile a division of Newark Corporation
- CADsoft Consulting, a US-based consulting company offering support, software and training to AEC professionals
- Cadsoft Corporation, a Canada-based developer of 3D Building Information Modeling software
