= CR-5000 =

CR-5000 is Zuken's EDA design suite for electronic systems and printed circuit boards aimed at the enterprise market. It was developed to address complex design needs that involve managing the complete development and manufacturing preparation process on an enterprise-wide scale. CR-5000 is made to facilitate the design of complex and high-speed boards, with features aimed at addressing challenges such as signal integrity and electromagnetic compatibility.

CR-5000 is the fourth-generation successor of CREATE1000, originally developed for the PDP-11 by Zukei-Gijutsu-Kenkyusho (Japanese for "Graphic Technology and Research Laboratory"). The main CR-5000 software is developed at the headquarters of Zuken in Yokohama, Japan. Other modules are developed at Zuken's EMC Technology Center in Paderborn, Germany, which is known for its research in EMC and SI simulation tools, and Zuken Technology Center in Bristol, England, which focuses on routing tools. The latest version as of June 2012 is CR-5000 version 14.

== Tools ==
- Design Gateway: Zuken's platform for logical circuit design and verification of single and multi-board system-level electronic designs.
- CR-5000 Component Manager: A library tool that provides comprehensive parts library management and wizard-generated custom versions of symbols and components.
- CR-5000 Constraints Manager: A fully integrated successor to Zuken's Hot-stage2. It allows the input and management of constraints for multiple domains, eliminating rework and unnecessary prototypes.
- CR-5000 Lightning: A virtual prototyping solution for High-Speed PCB design, integrating routing and PCB simulation tools. It offers analysis and simulation features, including EMC and power integrity options.
- CR-5000 Graphical Pin Manager: Enables a straightforward FPGA and PCB co-design flow, from top-level Hardware description language (HDL) description to schematic symbols, as well as to the physical I/O information for layout.
- CR-5000 Board Designer: An enterprise PCB design tool covering various aspects of the PCB design process. It aims to improve electronic product design quality by providing editing, collaboration, and verification features, both within the CR-5000 system and through integration with select third-party solutions.
- CR-5000 Board Modeler: Optimized for the verification of PCB layouts in their mechanical environment. It provides a 3D view of the PCB in the mechanical enclosure, allowing electrical or mechanical engineers to check for conflicts and verify spacing and fit. Supports STEP, ACIS, STL, and IDF formats.
- CR-5000 DFM Center ADM: Performs manufacturability checking in parallel with the layout process. Integrated with Zuken's CR-5000 PCB design suite, DFM Center enables direct data transfer from design to manufacturing, saving time and reducing errors.
- CR-5000 Board Producer: A tool designed to assist in optimizing manufacturing output, with capabilities to adjust silkscreens, solder masks, stencils, test points, and panelization, among other features.

== See also ==
- CR-2000
- CR-3000
- CR-8000
- Comparison of EDA software
- List of free electronics circuit simulators
- Zuken
- Cadstar
