= 9V =

9V or 9-V may refer to:

- Nine-volt battery
- Killed by 9V Batteries, an Austrian indie rock band
- PG-9V, a model of the SPG-9 gun
- 9V Avior Airlines - IATA code
- Singapore - aircraft registration code

== See also ==
- V9 (disambiguation)
