= PCB (software) =

Free and open-source software suite for electronic design automation

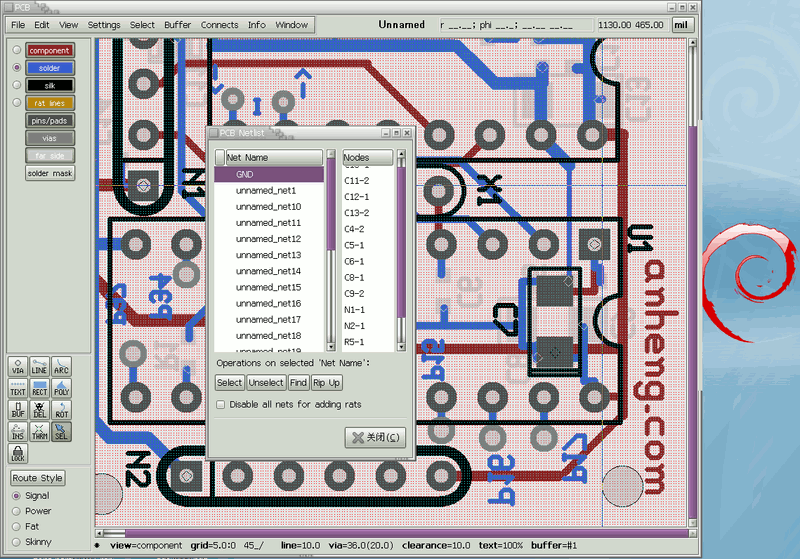
- Developer(s): Thomas Nau
- Initial release: 1990
- Stable release: 4.3.0 / 1 March 2021; 4 years ago
- Repository: git.geda-project.org/pcb.git
- Operating system: Unix-like (BSDs, Linux, Solaris, OS X (experimental) and Microsoft Windows
- Type: Electronic design automation (EDA)
- License: GPLv2
- Website: pcb.geda-project.org

PCB is a free and open-source software suite for electronic design automation (EDA) - for printed circuit boards (PCB) layout. It uses GTK+ for its GUI widgets.

== History ==
PCB was first written by Thomas Nau for an Atari ST in 1990 and ported to UNIX and X11 in 1994. Initially PCB was not intended to be a professional layout system but as a tool for individuals to do small-scale development of hardware. The second release 1.2 introduced user menus. This made PCB easier to use and increased its popularity. Harry Eaton took over PCB development beginning with Release 1.5, although he contributed some code from Release 1.4.3.

PCB includes a topological autorouter named Toporouter, developed by Anthony Blake in a Google-funded open source project mentored by DJ Delorie in 2008. It is mostly based on an implementation of the algorithms described in Tal Dayan's 1997 PhD thesis, "Rubberband based topological router". This router has meanwhile been adapted for use with the open-source KiCad project as well.

In 2013, pcb-rnd was forked from PCB.

== Features ==
- Scalable fonts
- Layer groups to keep signals together
- Add on device drivers
- Gerber RS-274X and NC Drill output support
- Centroid (X-Y) data output
- PostScript and Encapsulated PostScript output
- Rats-nest generation from simple net lists
- Automatic clearance around pins that pierce a polygon
- Flags for pins and vias
- Groups of action commands can be undone by a single undo
- Simple design rule checker (DRC) - checks for minimum spacing and overlap rules
- Drawing directly on the silk layer
- Viewable solder-mask layers and editing
- Netlist window
- Netlist entry by drawing rats
- Auto router
- Snap to pins and pads
- Element files and libraries that can contain whole sub-layouts, metric grids
- Up to 16 copper layer designs by default
- Trace optimizer
- Rats nest
- Connectivity verification
- Can interoperate with free schematic capture tools such as gEDA and XCircuit
- GNU autoconf/automake based build system
- PCB is Free Software

== File formats ==
=== Import ===
- PCB accepts textual file in the form of a network lists and associated pins. Such file may be produced from a GEDA or XCircuit program or some other

=== Export ===
- bom: Bill of materials.
- gcode: G-code.
- gerber: Gerber.
- .ps: PostScript.
- .eps: Eps.
- .png: Image.
- .nelma: Nelma.
- .gsvit
- .ipc-d-356

== See also ==
- Comparison of EDA software
- List of free electronics circuit simulators
