= Vitech =

American software company

- logo_alt=Vitech Logo
- Type: Privately held company
- Industry: Software, consulting
- Founded: 1992
- Founder: David Long
- Headquarters: Blacksburg, Virginia, U.S.
- Area served: Worldwide
- Key people: Brian Selvy (President & Chief Executive Officer) Doug Johnston (Chief Financial Officer) Lou Priolo (Vice President of Engineering)
- Products: GENESYS (systems engineering software); Sidekick (Collaboration and tasking software for MBSE)
- Number of employees: 25
- Website: vitechcorp.com

Vitech, formerly known as Vitech Corporation and now known as Zuken Vitech Inc., is a model-based systems engineering (MBSE) software, services, and training company responsible for the development and management of a model-based systems engineering tool, GENESYS, and a collaboration and tasking tool, Sidekick. Vitech products have a range of applications and have been used for program management by the U.S. Department of Energy, for railway modernization and waste management in Europe, and for space station and ground-based air defense system development in Australia. In an effort to promote the study of model-based systems engineering, Vitech partners with universities throughout the United States, providing them with its software for instructional and research purposes.

== History ==
Vitech Corporation was established in 1992 in Vienna, Virginia by David Long, who was an undergraduate student at Virginia Tech. Long, who at the time was majoring in engineering science and mechanics and studying under Benjamin Blanchard and Wolter Fabrycky, developed a software program to meet the requirements for a senior project. He began the project as a tool for academic use, then refined it to make CORE, a modeling environment for systems engineering problems, while earning his master's degree in systems engineering at Virginia Tech. Long initially sought to license the program through an existing company, but eventually opted to manage and market the product himself, establishing Vitech Corporation in the process.

CORE has gone on to become a tool used in the teaching of model-based systems engineering, and is cited in engineering textbooks such as Systems Engineering: Design Principles and Models, by Dahai Liu, The Engineering Design of Systems Models and Methods (pp. 62–66), by Dennis M. Buede and William D. Miller, and System Engineering Management (p. 243), by Benjamin S. Blanchard and John E. Blyler. CORE is offered free to universities such as MIT and the Naval Postgraduate School as part of the Vitech University Program.

In 2011, David Long, former president, and Zane Scott, former vice president of Professional Services at Vitech, wrote A Primer for Model-Based Systems Engineering. The book outlines the systems thinking approach and reviews the basic concepts of model-based systems engineering.

In August 2019, Vitech was acquired by Zuken, Inc. as a wholly owned subsidiary. The acquisition had the approval of the United States Department of Defense and the Committee on Foreign Investment in the United States (CFIUS). Effective April 22, 2020, Vitech Corporation formally changed its name to Zuken Vitech Inc.

== Products ==
- CORE - Vitech's original product, CORE, was a systems engineering software tool whose principal feature is a single, integrated model that supports model-based systems engineering. CORE is used widely in corporations and governmental organizations and referenced in systems engineering textbooks such as A Practical Guide to SysML, Systems Engineering: Design Principles and Models, The Engineering Design of Systems Models and Methods, and System Engineering Management. The end-of-life (EOL) for CORE was announced on September 20, 2023.
- GENESYS - In 2012, Vitech launched GENESYS, a systems engineering tool built on the .NET Framework with MATLAB, ModelCenter, and Digital Thread connectivity that delivers connected, enterprise-wide systems engineering. BusinessWire reported on the announcement and release of GENESYS, highlighting its new features. The release of GENESYS 2025 was announced on June 10, 2025.
- Sidekick - In 2025, Vitech launched Sidekick, a web-based collaboration and review companion for GENESYS. Sidekick was developed to solve the most common problems faced by non-modeler stakeholders with a need to access, collaborate, and review model content: simply accessing the model repository, navigating to the correct information, and comprehending systems-engineering domain-specific jargon and diagram notation. Sidekick solves these issues by providing stakeholders an easily accessible web-native interface, task-based assignments, intuitive conversation interfaces, and dashboards. The release of Sidekick v1 was announced on July 15, 2025.
- A Primer for Model-Based Systems Engineering - Published by Vitech in 2011 and authored by former Vitech President David Long and former Vice President for Professional Services Zane Scott, this primer presents the basic concepts of model-based systems engineering. The book is offered free from Vitech, and is frequently used in university courses to introduce concepts in model-based systems engineering. In 2012, BusinessWire noted the release of the second edition of the book. In the fall of 2017, Massachusetts Institute of Technology used the primer as part of its four-course online program, Architecture and Systems Engineering: Models and Methods to Manage Complex Systems.

== Services ==
Vitech Corporation offers a range of systems engineering consulting services to private sector firms as well as governmental organizations such as DOD, DOE, and NASA.
