= TARGET (CAD software) =

CAD computer program

TARGET 3001!
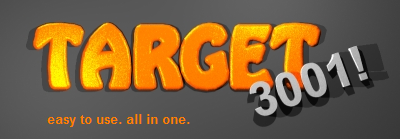

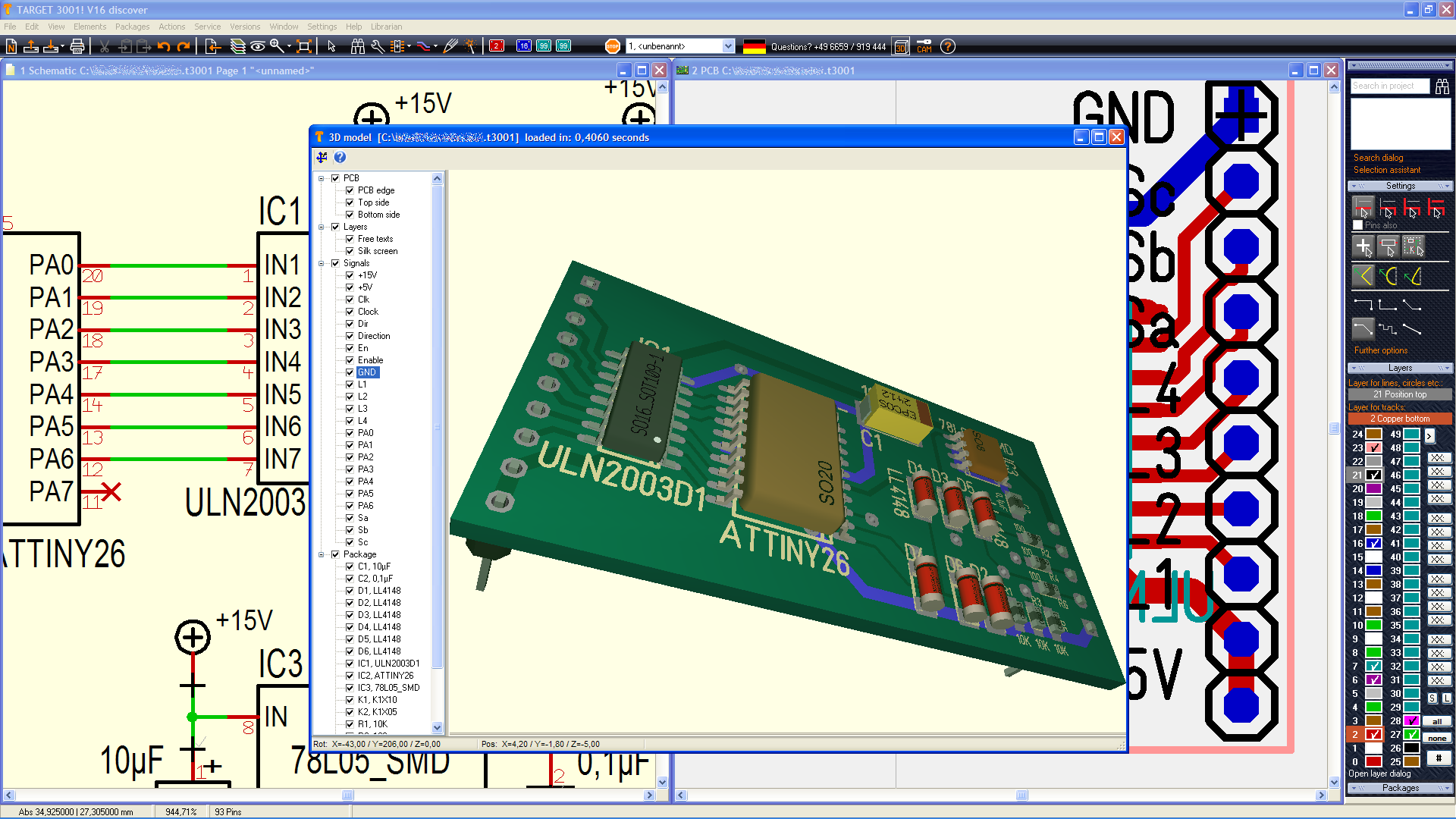
- GUI with live 3D
- Developers: Ing.-Büro Friedrich, Eichenzell
- Release: 1992; 34 years ago
- Stable release: V33.2 / 2 January 2025; 21 months ago
- Operating system: Windows, Linux (Wine)
- Platform: Windows
- Available in: English, French, German
- Type: Electronic design automation
- License: Proprietary, free versions available
- Website: www.ibfriedrich.com

TARGET 3001! is a CAD computer program for EDA and PCB (printing circuit board) design, developed by Ing.-Büro (en: engineering office) Friedrich in Germany. This software application has been available since 1992 (for 32 years) and operates on Microsoft Windows. It supports the design of electronic schematics, PCBs, and device front panels. The software is available in English, German and French.

It is possible to use Target 3001! on Linux systems with the assistance of Wine, a compatibility layer for running Windows applications on Unix-like operating systems. This setup has been tested with Ubuntu 11.04 (64-bit).

A notable feature of Target 3001! is its ability to support reverse engineering. Users can derive a circuit drawing from a photograph of an existing circuit board through the traced layout. A special branch of the program is the ASIC Designer, which allows design of integrated circuits.

The company offer a free version of the service for non-commercial use, which is limited to 250 connection pins or pads on two copper layers. The PCB manufacturer PCB-Pool and Conrad Electronic provide a free unlimited version, that generates only printed output or output for PCB-Pool and Conrad's PCB service. Commercial versions with all features are available.

== History ==
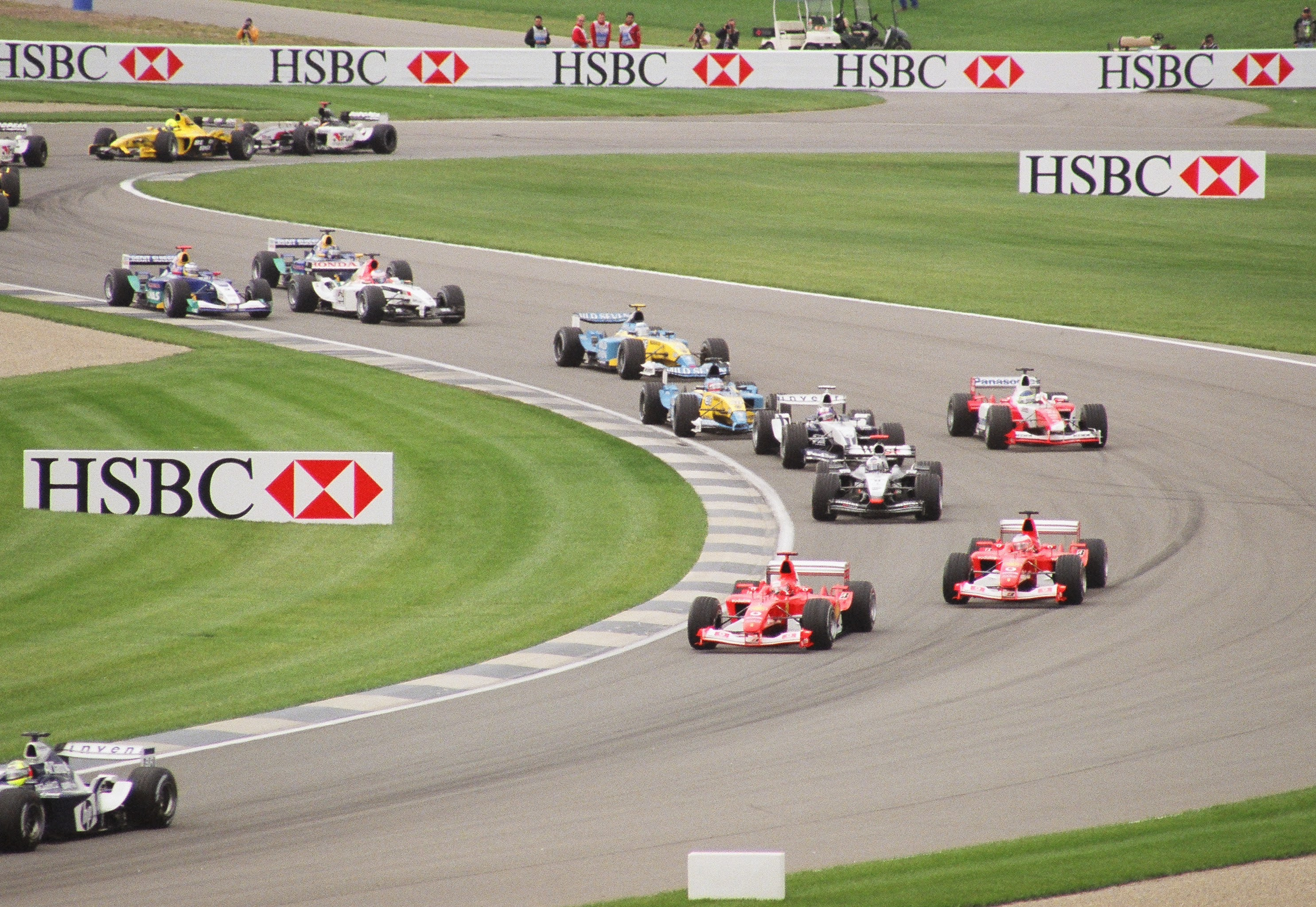
Panasonic-TOYOTA (3rd in red) cable harnesses being designed by TARGET 3001!

A predecessor of TARGET 3001! was "RULE" (German: Rechner Unterstützter Leiterplatten Entwurf), an MS-DOS program developed for PCB layout (1989). The software gained popularity among hobbyists, leading to requests for additional features such as a circuit diagram input function and autorouter, which is an automatic routing function. In response, TARGET 2.1 (for MS-DOS) was released in 1992.

The transition to Windows was initially challenging: early versions of "TARGET V3 for Windows" were prone to frequent crashes. However, as the stability and performance of the package improves, the software's user base expanded beyound hobbyists and educational users to include professionals.

The software package continued to develop with significant expansions starting from version V7. Developments in versions V7 to V16 included an EMC tool and PSPICE-compatible simulation. The name TARGET was evolved over time, becoming TARGET 2001!, before ultimately being changed to "TARGET 3001!" in anticipation of the new millennium. This name was registered as a trademark with the German Patent Office and used for versions V9 and higher.

TARGET 3001! is used also by industrial designers. For example, TOYOTA used it for cable harnesses in their Formula 1 racing car.

Today, TARGET 3001! is one of the most popular PCB layout systems in Germany and Europe. In 2004, readers of electronics magazine Elektor voted it number two. Testers of the electronics magazine "c't Hardware Hacks" rated it number two in 2013.

== Features ==
Over the years, TARGET 3001! has been enhanced with several features, combined under one user interface (MDI). These include an EMC module, symbol and housing generators, and SPICE-compatible simulation. Users can design front panels in conjunction with PCBs, and a 3D view feature offers a visual impression of the designed PCB.

All project information is stored in one file to avoid redundancy and version conflicts. Design begins with the creation of a schematic diagram and usually ends with the layout of a PCB (or chip).

The schematics can be simulated by the integrated PSPICE-compatible mixed mode simulator. Components are stored in a SQLite or MySQL database, also externally accessible. Component data include direct links to datasheets and component supplier information as well as simulation information and 3D models. TARGET's open Component Interchange Format CXF is supported by universal component databases like Ultra Librarian and Footprint Expert.

PCBs or ASICs can be designed manually or using an autoplacer and autorouter. A Specctra interface to external autorouters is available. The design can be automatically checked for spacing violations and many other design rules. If the PCB is ready designed it can be directly displayed and rotated in a live 3D view. The 3D data can be exported in STEP format to produce preview 3D dummies of the PCB on 3D printers. Circuit design on 3D bodies (Molded Interconnect Device, MID) is possible.

CNC data for PCB milling can be obtained in several formats. Additionally a device front panel can directly be derived from the PCB, using the coordinates on the PCB, e.g. from LEDs or potentiometers.

=== Library System ===
A crucial component of any EDA software is its component libraries. The library system in Target 3001! has undergone several changes:

- Initially, the software attempted to include all electronic components from the distributor Conrad Electronic SE, resulting in cumbersome handling and bloated libraries, which hindered the search function.
- From version V15, components have been managed in a parametrically searchable offline SQL database.
- Version V16 introduced dual-monitor operation and a visualized search using a "gallery."
- In version V17, a housing generator was added, and the company’s component portal, Componiverse, was integrated.
- Version V18 saw the release of a component toolbar and a symbol generator.

Moreover, components from the Library Loader portal by SamacSys Ltd. are available for use in Target 3001!.

=== Functions ===
Target 3001! includes a comprehensive set of functions for designing circuit diagrams and creating corresponding layouts for printed circuit boards (PCBs). During the layout process, the software ensures consistency between the circuit and the layout.

A component in the circuit diagram comprises several elements:

- A symbol, which typically includes an assigned connection diagram.
- A housing.
- The footprint, representing the solder terminal shape of the component.

Links to component datasheets and suppliers can be stored within the component data. Both circuit symbols and component housings can be custom-designed, assigned to each other, or created and modified using the housing generator. Additionally, 3D models, including STEP-3D formats, can be created and imported for the housings.

The software supports (P)SPICE-compatible circuit diagram simulation, allowing users to simulate the functionality of the circuit in advance. The library contains electrical simulation models for numerous components to facilitate this process.

Layouts on three-dimensional surfaces, such as molded interconnect devices (MID), are also supported. For this purpose, STEP files can be imported into the software.

=== Advanced Features in Later Versions ===
From version V20 onwards, Target 3001! introduced advanced manual layout capabilities, including the "push and shove" feature, which automatically clears space for additional traces by moving existing traces aside. Additionally, a "pilot router" feature attempts to autonomously lay traces between the start and finish points.

=== Automatic Tools ===
The software includes several automated tools to aid in PCB design:

- Autoplacer and Autorouter: These tools facilitate the automatic routing of the PCB layout.
- Design Rule Check (DRC): This feature checks the design for short circuits and other violations of predefined design rules, such as minimum distances and drill diameters.

=== Relational Consistency ===
Like other EDA software, Target 3001! maintains relational consistency between the circuit design (circuit diagram) and PCB layout (back annotation). This ensures that only the connections intended in the circuit design are made in the layout.

=== Output Capabilities ===
Target 3001! can generate universally usable data for PCB production and assembly, including:

- Gerber Format Data: Used by PCB manufacturers, with selectable output layers. Many manufacturers can also process supplied Target files directly.
- ODB++ Format Data: Used by PCB manufacturers for the blank PCB and the component assembly as well.
- Pick-and-Place File: A text file listing component positions for the pick-and-place machine.
- Parts List: A customizable list of components used in the design.

=== Integration of Circuit Diagram and PCB Layout ===
A distinguishing feature of Target 3001! compared to widely used software like Eagle EDA is that both the circuit diagram and PCB layout are stored within a single project file. This integration simplifies the design process and ensures coherence between the circuit and layout aspects of the project.

== See also ==
- Comparison of EDA software
- List of free electronics circuit simulators
