= Maze runner =

Routing method in electronic design

In electronic design automation, maze runner is a connection routing method that represents the entire routing space as a grid. Parts of this grid are blocked by components, specialised areas, or already present wiring. The grid size corresponds to the wiring pitch of the area. The goal is to find a chain of grid cells that go from point A to point B.

A maze runner may use the Lee algorithm. It uses a wave propagation style (a wave are all cells that can be reached in n steps) throughout the routing space. The wave stops when the target is reached, and the path is determined by backtracking through the cells.

== See also ==
- Autorouter
