= Lee algorithm =

Algorithm based on breadth-first search to solve mazes

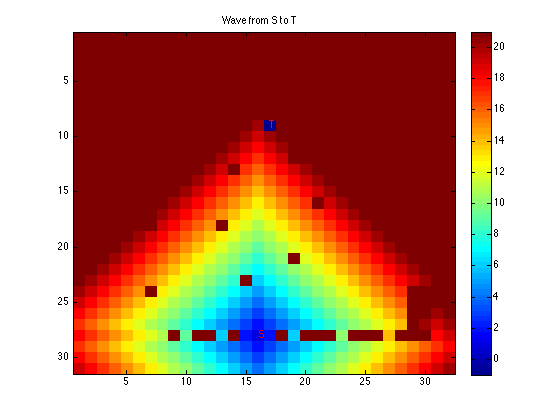
Wave Expansion step

The Lee algorithm is one possible solution for maze routing problems based on breadth-first search. It always gives an optimal solution, if one exists, but is slow and requires considerable memory.

== Algorithm ==
Initialization

Select start point, mark with 0
i := 0

Wave expansion

REPEAT

Mark all unlabeled neighbors of points marked with i with i+1
i := i+1

UNTIL ((target reached) or (no points can be marked))

Backtrace

go to the target point
REPEAT

go to next node that has a lower mark than the current node
add this node to path

UNTIL (start point reached)

Clearance

Block the path for future wirings
Delete all marks

Of course the wave expansion marks only points in the routable area of the chip, not in the blocks or already wired parts, and to minimize segmentation you should keep in one direction as long as possible.
