= Forthing Xinghai V9 =

Plug-in hybrid minivan

Overview
- Manufacturer: Forthing
- Also called: Forthing V9 U-Tour (Europe); Forthing V-Tour (Poland); Tiger Nine (Italy); Dongfeng V9 (Qatar); Cirelli 9zero9 (Italy)
- Production: June 2024 – present
- Assembly: China: Liuzhou

Body and chassis
- Class: Minivan (M)
- Body style: 5-door minivan
- Layout: FF layout
- Platform: Super Cube EMA
- Related: Forthing T5 Evo; Forthing Yacht

Powertrain
- Engine: Petrol PHEV: 1.5 L I4
- Electric motor: Permanent magnet synchronous
- Transmission: 1-speed DHT
- Hybrid drivetrain: PHEV
- Battery: 34.9 kWh (126 MJ) Li-ion
- Range: 160 km

Dimensions
- Wheelbase: 3,018 mm (118.8 in)
- Length: 5,248 mm (206.6 in)
- Width: 1,920 mm (75.6 in)
- Height: 1,820 mm (71.7 in)
- Curb weight: 2,850 kg (6,283 lb)

The Forthing Xinghai V9 (Chinese: 风行 星海V9; pinyin: Fengxing Xinghai V9) is a plug-in hybrid minivan produced by Dongfeng Liuzhou Motor under the Forthing brand. The Forthing Xinghai V9 is the first model in the Xinghai line.

== Overview ==
The Xinghai V9 debuted at the 2024 Auto China exhibition as the inaugural model of the Xinghai new energy family. The vehicle was developed as a large plug-in hybrid MPV targeting both family and executive transportation segments.

At launch, the Xinghai V9 was offered in multiple trim levels priced between 199,900 and 279,900 yuan. The Xinghai V9 was designed around Chinese cultural themes and was introduced with two distinct front-end styling packages. According to industry reports, the two versions are known as the Qingyun Ti (青云梯, "Ladder to the Clouds") Series and the Chinese Knot (中国结) Series. The vehicle features a seven-seat interior arranged in a 2+2+3 configuration. The design emphasizes a balance between business-oriented luxury and family practicality.

=== Qingyun Ti (青云梯) Series ===
The Qingyun Ti Series is distinguished by a large grille composed of multiple horizontal chrome bars intended to resemble a traditional Chinese ceremonial staircase or ladder ascending into the clouds. Automotive publications have described the design as emphasizing prestige and executive presence, targeting buyers seeking a more conventional luxury MPV appearance.

The Qingyun Ti design became the basis for several later model-year updates and special editions.

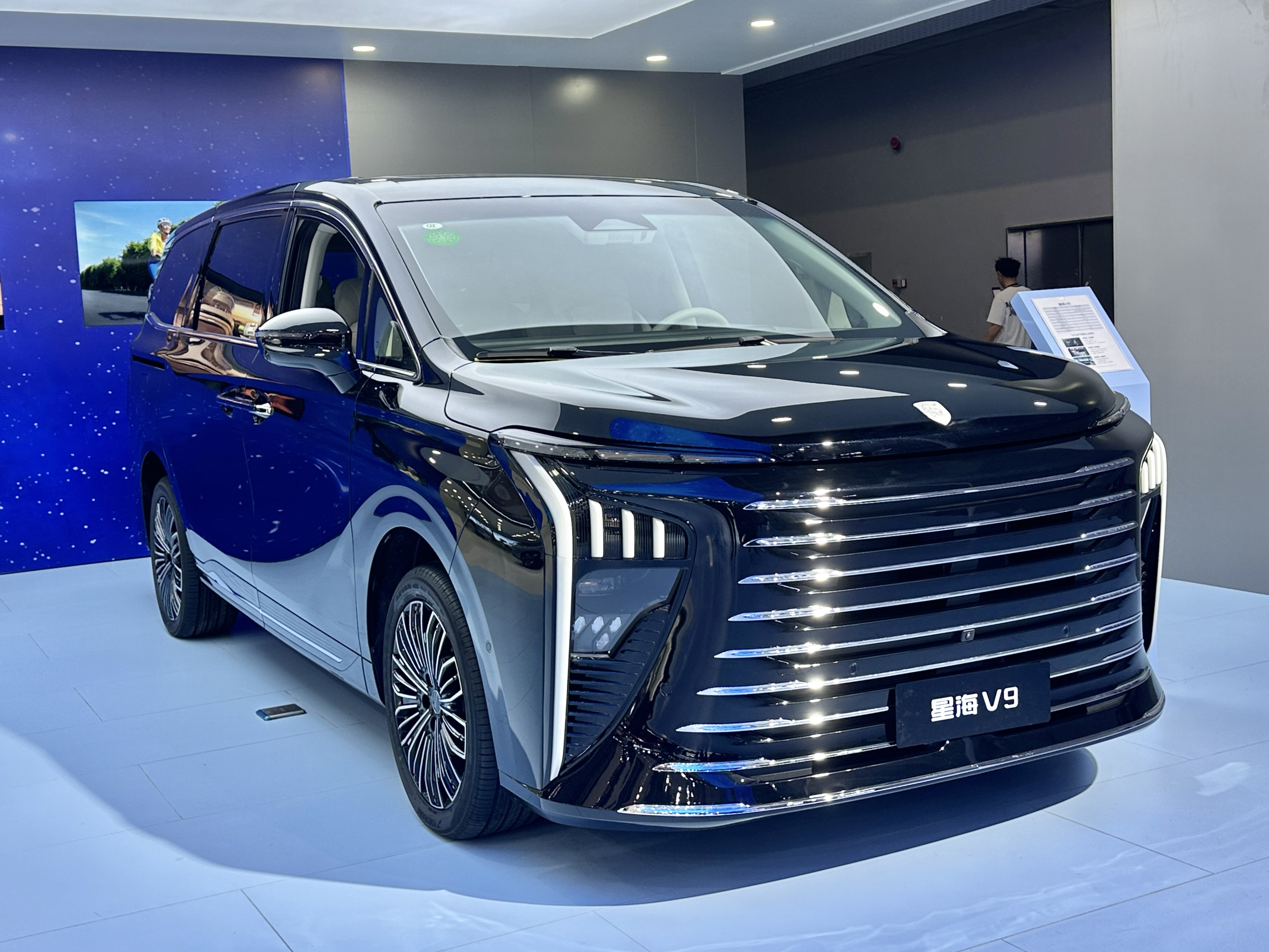
Forthing Xinghai V9 Qingyun Ti (青云梯)

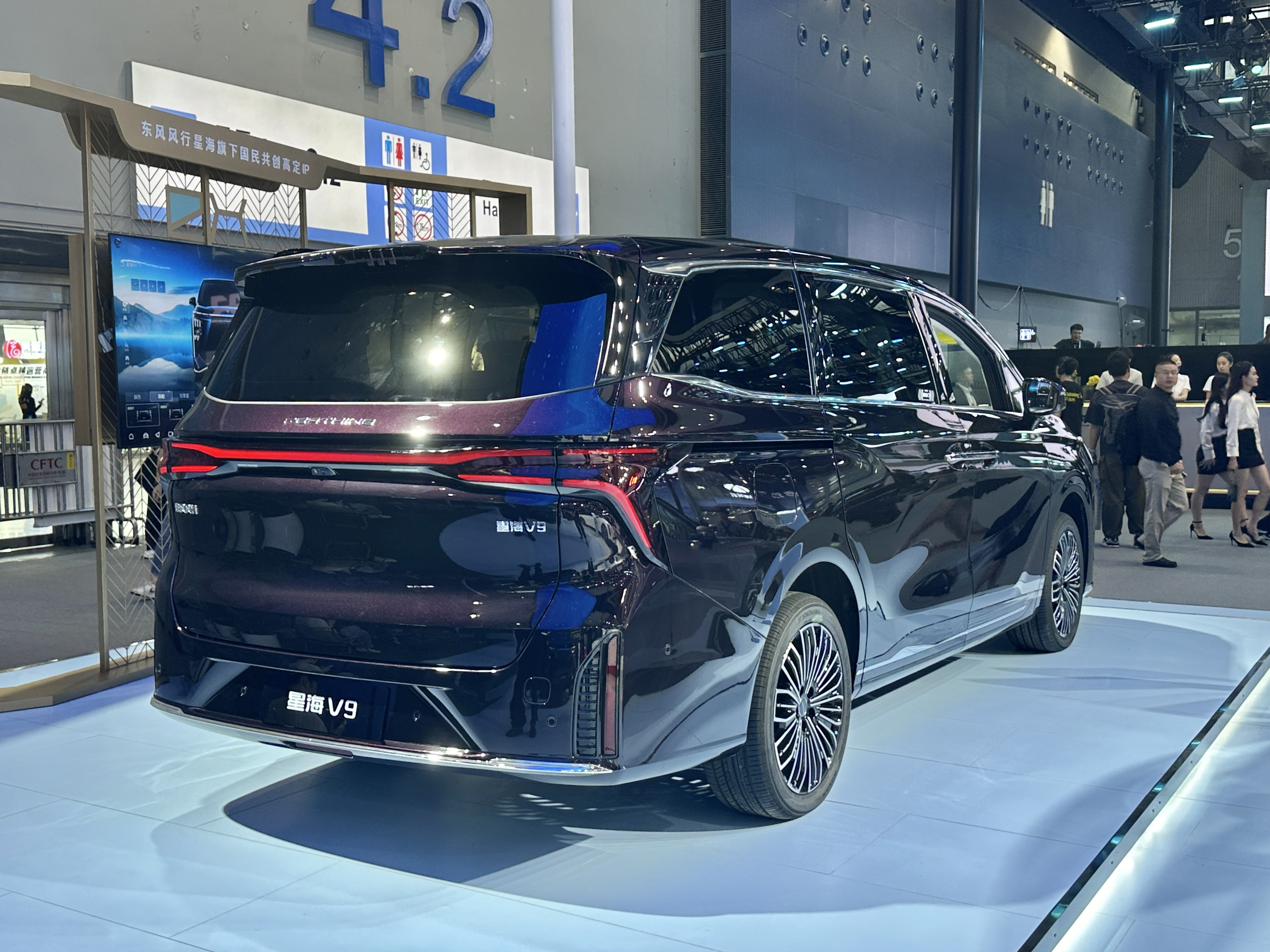
Rear view

=== Chinese Knot (中国结) Series ===
The Chinese Knot Series adopts a vertically oriented grille pattern. The upper section incorporates decorative elements inspired by the traditional Chinese knot, a cultural symbol associated with unity, prosperity, and good fortune. Compared with the Qingyun Ti version, the Chinese Knot model presents a more distinctive and ornamental front fascia.

Both styling variants share the same body structure, dimensions, and powertrain options.

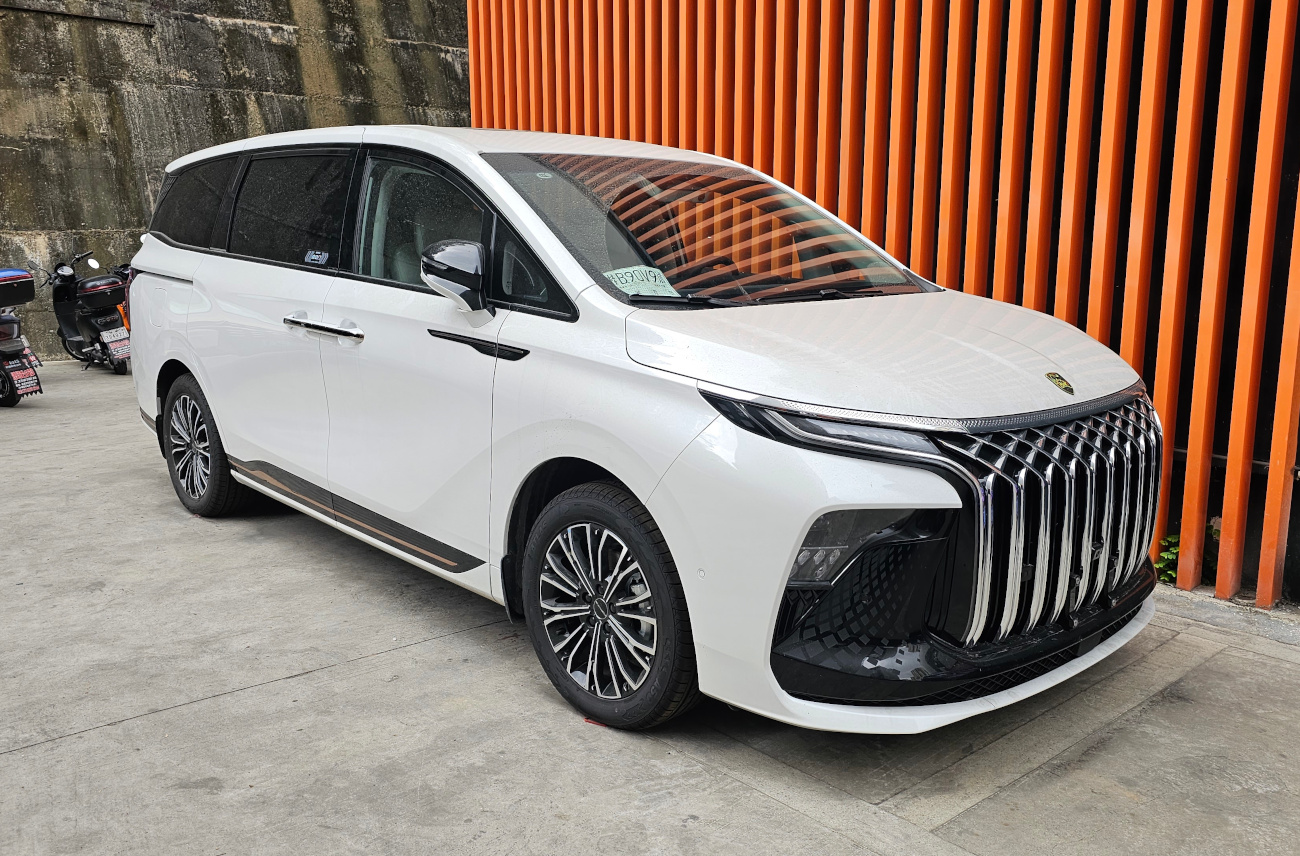
Forthing Xinghai V9 Chinese Knot (中国结)

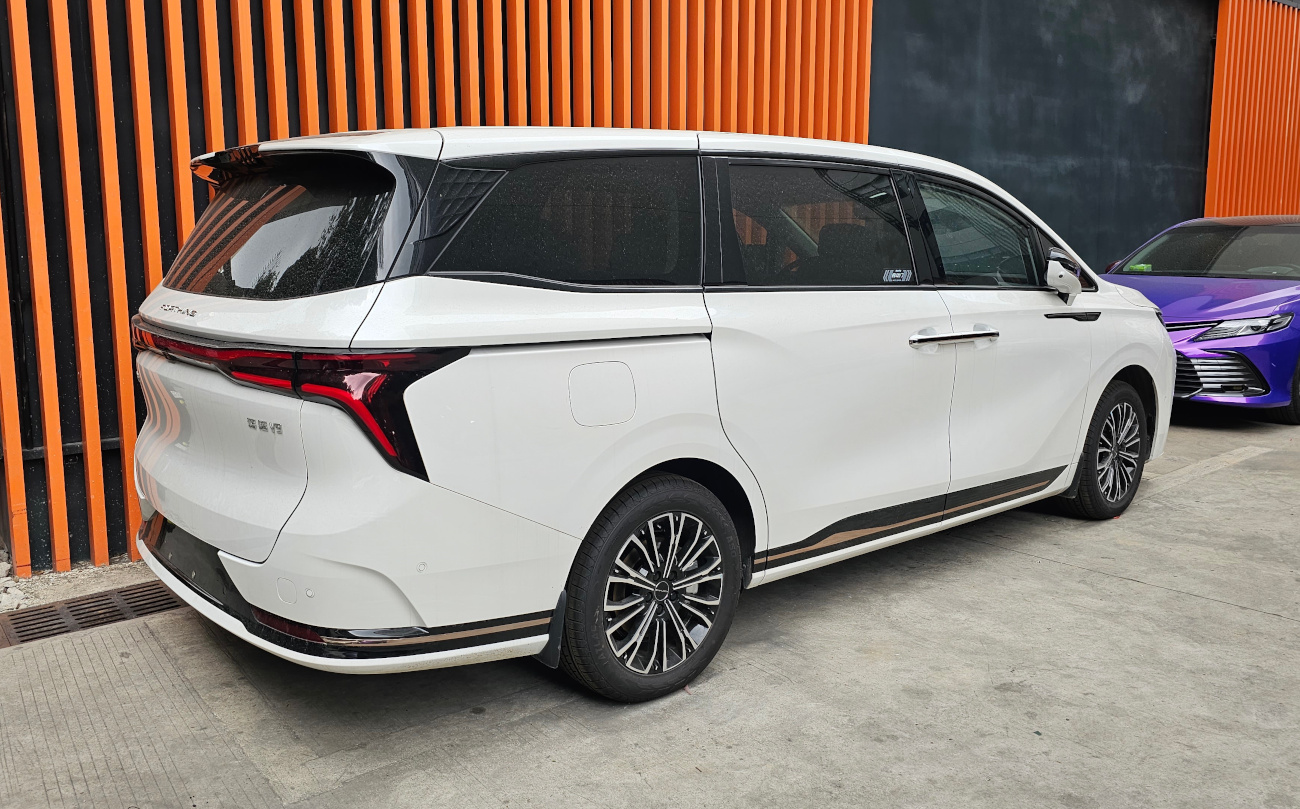
Rear view

=== 2026 model year ===
In August 2025, Forthing introduced the 2026 model-year Xinghai V9. The updated range added the Yuexiang (越享) Series while retaining the existing plug-in hybrid powertrain. Pricing was reduced compared with the original launch range, with entry-level variants starting below 200,000 yuan.

== Powertrain ==
The Xinghai V9 is powered by a plug-in hybrid system consisting of a 1.5-litre turbocharged gasoline engine and an electric motor driving the front wheels through a dedicated hybrid transmission. Combined system output is reported at approximately 228 kW (306 hp) with 540 Nm of torque.

The model is equipped with a 34.9 kWh battery pack and offers up to 200 km of CLTC-rated electric driving range depending on specification. Total combined driving range is reported at approximately 1,300 km under the CLTC cycle.

== Markets ==
The model was launched in China in June 2024 and was simultaneously introduced to selected overseas markets as part of Dongfeng Liuzhou Motor's export expansion strategy.

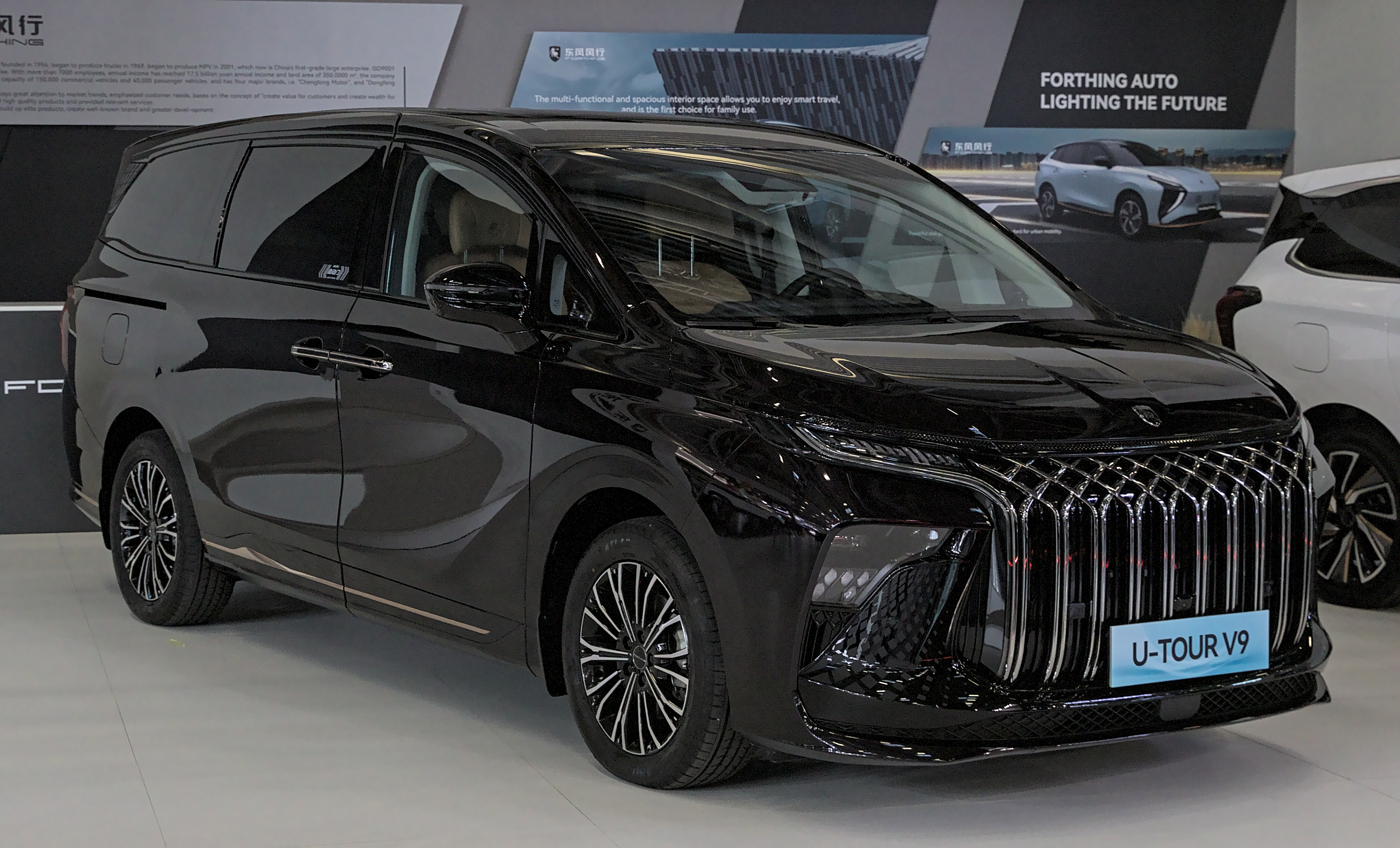
Forthing V9 U-Tour (Europe)

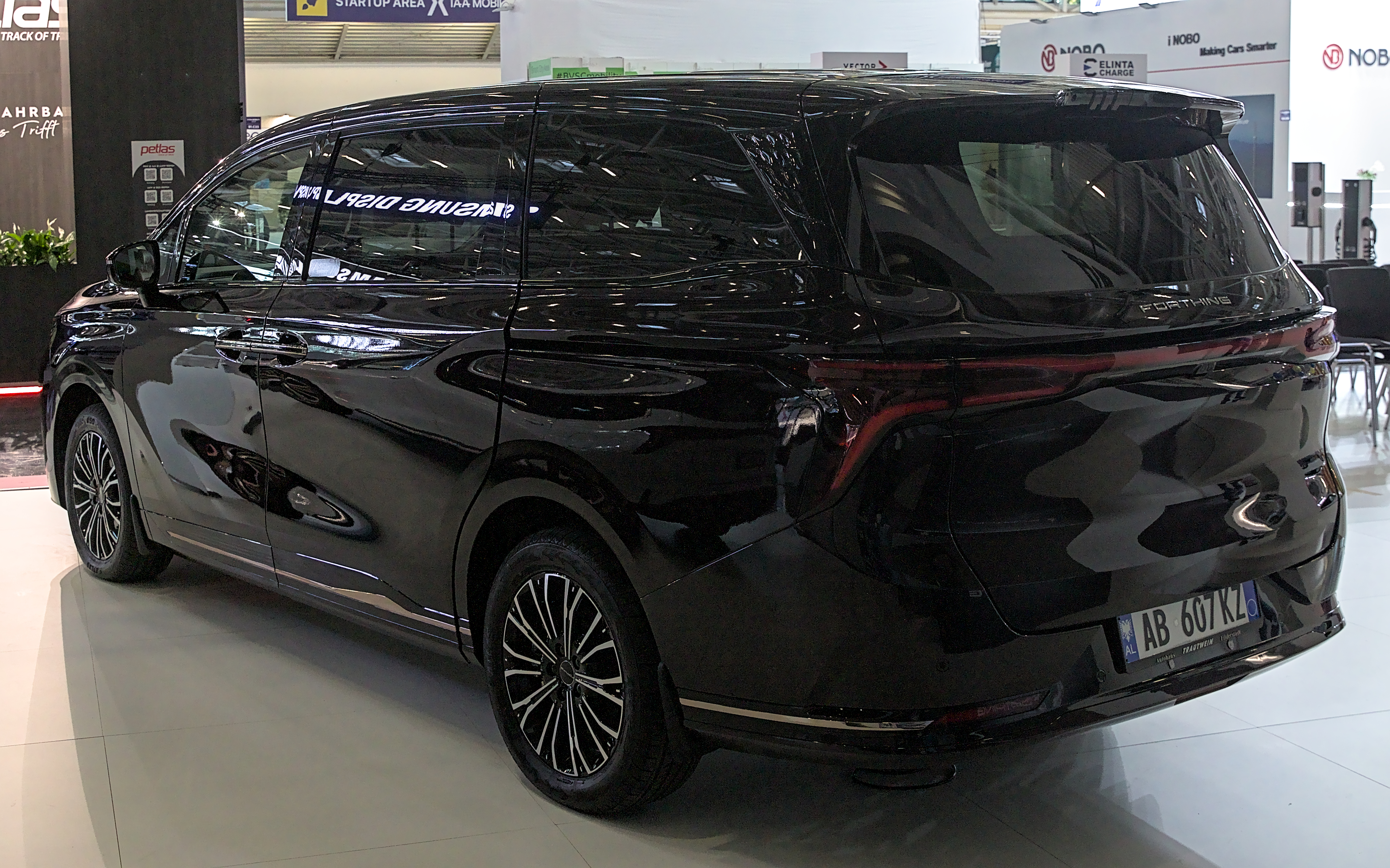
Rear view

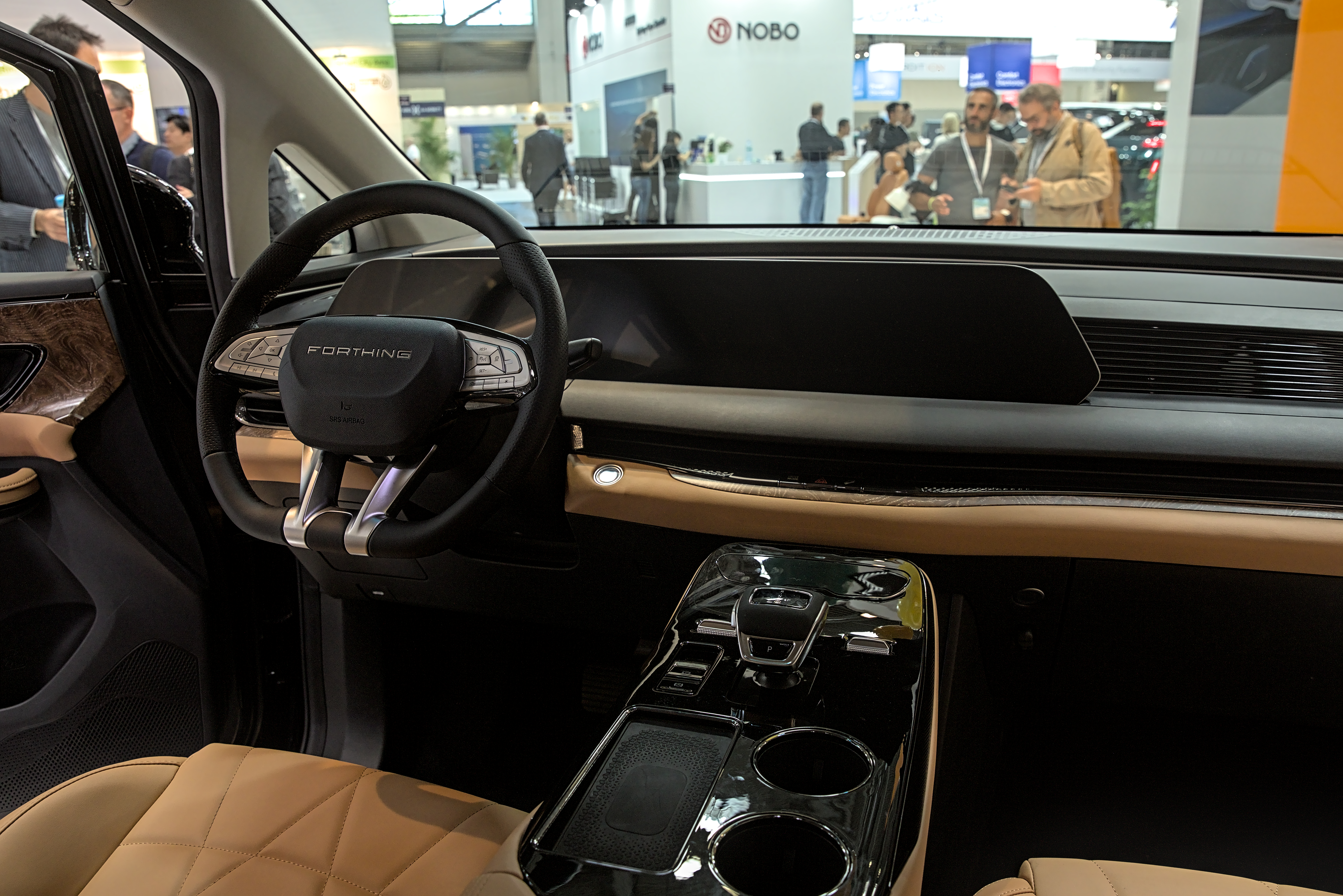
Interior

== Sales ==
The Xinghai V9 became one of the best-selling models in the newly established Xinghai product line. According to Chinese market data, the model recorded several thousand domestic sales during its first full year on the market and remained one of Forthing's primary new energy vehicles through 2025.

Year	China
2024	4,863
2025	4,363
