= EAGLE (program) =

Scriptable electronic design automation application

- Screenshot of an EAGLE project in PCB view
- Developer: Autodesk (previously CadSoft Computer)
- Release: 1988; 38 years ago
- Stable release: 9.6.2 / 27 May 2020
- Operating system: Windows, Linux, Mac OS X, previously also OS/2 and DOS
- Platform: 64-bit (previously also 32-bit and 16-bit) x86 PCs
- Available in: English, German, Hungarian, Chinese, Russian
- Type: ECAD/EDA, CAM
- License: subscription
- Website: autodesk.com/products/eagle

EAGLE was a scriptable electronic design automation (EDA) application with schematic capture, printed circuit board (PCB) layout, auto-router and computer-aided manufacturing (CAM) features. EAGLE stood for Easily Applicable Graphical Layout Editor (German: Einfach Anzuwendender Grafischer Layout-Editor) and was developed by CadSoft Computer GmbH. The company was acquired by Autodesk Inc. in 2016 who announced to support the product up to 2026 only. EAGLE has been phased out with Fusion being used for PCB design.

== Features ==
EAGLE contains a schematic editor, for designing circuit diagrams. Schematics are stored in files with .SCH extension, parts are defined in device libraries with .LBR extension. Parts can be placed on many sheets and connected together through ports.

The PCB layout editor stores board files with the extension .BRD. It allows back-annotation to the schematic and auto-routing to automatically connect traces based on the connections defined in the schematic.

EAGLE saves Gerber and PostScript layout files as well as Excellon and Sieb & Meyer drill files. These are standard file formats accepted by PCB fabrication companies, but given EAGLE's typical user base of small design firms and hobbyists, many PCB fabricators and assembly shops also accept EAGLE board files (with extension .BRD) directly to export optimized production files and pick-and-place data themselves.

EAGLE provides a multi-window graphical user interface and menu system for editing, project management and to customize the interface and design parameters. The system can be controlled via mouse, keyboard hotkeys or by entering specific commands at an embedded command line. Keyboard hotkeys can be user defined. Multiple repeating commands can be combined into script files (with file extension .SCR). It is also possible to explore design files utilizing an EAGLE-specific object-oriented programming language (with extension .ULP).

== History ==
The German CadSoft Computer GmbH was founded by Rudolf Hofer and Klaus-Peter Schmidinger in 1988 to develop EAGLE, a 16-bit PCB design application for DOS. Originally, the software consisted of a layout editor with part libraries only. An auto-router module became available as optional component later on. With EAGLE 2.0, a schematics editor was added in 1991. The software used BGI video drivers, and XPLOT to print. In 1992, version 2.6 changed the definition of layers, but designs created under older versions (up to 2.05) could be converted into the new format using the provided UPDATE26.EXE utility.

EAGLE 3.0 was changed to be a 32-bit extended DOS application in 1994.

Support for OS/2 Presentation Manager was added with version 3.5 in April 1996. This version also introduced multi-window support with forward-/backward-annotation, user-definable copper areas, and a built-in programming language with ULPs. It was also the first to no longer require a dongle.

In 2000, EAGLE version 4.0 officially dropped support for DOS and OS/2, but now being based on Qt 3 it added native support for Windows and was among the first professional electronic CAD tools available for Linux. A 32-bit DPMI version of EAGLE 4.0 running under DOS (Note: The 32-bit DPMI version of EAGLE was also tested to run on DR-DOS.) was still available on special request in order to help support existing customers, but it was not released commercially. Much later, in 2015, a special version of EAGLE 4.09r2 was made available by CadSoft to ease installation under Windows 7.

Starting with version 4.13, EAGLE became available for Mac OS X, with versions before 5.0.0 still requiring X11. Version 5.0.0 officially dropped support for Windows 9x and Windows NT 3.x/4.x in 2008. This version was based on Qt 4 and introduced user-definable attributes.

On 24 September 2009, Premier Farnell announced the acquisition of CadSoft Computer GmbH.

Version 5.91.0 introduced an XML-based file format in 2011 but continued to read the older binary format. It could not, however, write files in the former format, thereby not allowing collaboration with EAGLE 5.12.0 and earlier. EAGLE 6.0.0 no longer supported Mac OS X on the Power PC platform (only on Intel Macs), and the minimum requirements were changed to Mac OS X 10.6, Linux 2.6 and Windows XP. This version also introduced support for assembly variants and differential pair routing with length matching and automatic meandering.

Version 7.0.0 brought hierarchical designs, a new gridless topological pre-router called "TopRouter" for the conventional ripup-and-retry auto-router as well as multi-core support. Version 7.3.0 introduced native 64-bit versions for all three platforms in 2015. Version 7.6.0 dropped support for the 32-bit Mac OS X version in 2016. EAGLE 6.x.x continues to read EAGLE 7.x.x design files for as long as the hierarchical design feature isn't used.

On 27 June 2016, Autodesk announced the acquisition of CadSoft Computer GmbH from Premier Farnell, with Premier Farnell continuing to distribute CadSoft products for Autodesk. Autodesk changed the license to a subscription-only model starting with version 8.0.0 in 2017. Only 64-bit versions remain available. The file format used by EAGLE 8.0.0 and higher is not backward compatible with earlier EAGLE versions, however it does provide an export facility for saving an EAGLE 7.x compatible version of the design.

On 7 January 2020, EAGLE 9.5.2 was discontinued as a standalone product and only licensed to users as a bundled component (Fusion Electronics) with an Autodesk Fusion subscription license. The last standalone version of EAGLE is 9.6.2 as of 27 May 2020. Fusion Electronics design files carry a version 9.7.0 designation. Autodesk will ultimately end any support for EAGLE on 7 June 2026, requiring their users to migrate to Fusion Electronics to access existing designs after that date.

== License model ==
Since EAGLE version 8.0.0, there are Premium, Standard, Free, and Student & educator editions, with the Standard and Premium versions sold on a monthly or annual subscription basis, requiring online reactivation at least every 14 days (30 days since version 9.0).

In January 2020, EAGLE 9.5.2 was discontinued as a standalone product and is only licensed to users as a bundled component with an Autodesk Fusion subscription.

In 2023, Autodesk announced that they will no longer sell nor support EAGLE after 7 June 2026. Up to this date, active Autodesk Fusion subscriptions with or without EAGLE Premium will continue to give access to Fusion Electronics as well as EAGLE Premium functionality.

Comparison of features for the various available editions:

Version	Schematic sheets	Layers	PCB size	Use	Cost/month	Cost/year
Premium	999	16	4 m^{2}	Any	$65	$510
Student and educator	999	16	4 m^{2}	For student and educator use only	Free	Free
Standard	99	4	160 cm^{2}	Any	$15	$100
Free	2	2	80 cm^{2}	For individual, non-commercial use only	Free	Free

For comparison, the former (no longer obtainable) perpetual licensing scheme for EAGLE 7.x.x with costs referring to the 2016 prices for a single-user license:

Version	Schematic sheets	Layers	PCB size	Use	Cost ("LS" without Autorouter)	Cost (with Autorouter)
Ultimate (LS)	999	16	4 m^{2}	Any	$1145	$1640, €1385
Premium (LS)	99	6	160×100 mm^{2}	Any	$575	$820, €690
Maker	99	6	160×100 mm^{2}	For individual, non-commercial use only	N/A	$169, €140
Educational	99	6	160×100 mm^{2}	For non-commercial student and educator use only	N/A	Free
Standard	2	2	100×80 mm^{2}	Any	N/A	$69, €62
Express	2	2	100×80 mm^{2}	For individual, non-commercial use only	N/A	Free

== Community ==
A large group of textual and video tutorials exists for beginners to design their own PCBs.

The DIY electronics site SparkFun uses EAGLE and releases the EAGLE files for boards designed in-house. SparkFun Electronics is a company that has grown due to the hobbyist market exemplified by Make magazine and others. Many of these companies offer EAGLE part libraries which define schematic shapes, pinouts, and part sizes to allow for correct layout in the PCB layout editor.

Other popular libraries include Adafruit, Arduino, SnapEDA, and Dangerous Prototypes, element14 (a subsidiary of Farnell, former owners of CadSoft) also have some libraries available from their site.

Using ULPs to convert EAGLE .BRD files into Specctra-compatible design files (with file extension .DSN) it is possible to export designs for usage in conjunction with advanced external autorouters such as KONEKT ELECTRA, Eremex TopoR or Alfons Wirtz's FreeRouting. For further touching-up the finished designs in session format can be imported back into EAGLE via .SES to .SCR script file converters.

== Controversies ==
In spring 1991 the dongle protection scheme of EAGLE 2.0 had been cracked causing a decline of 30% in sales, while sales for a reduced demo version with a printed manual saw a significant increase. As a consequence in 1992 CadSoft sent thousands of floppy disks containing a new demo of EAGLE 2.6 to potential users, in particular those who had ordered the former demo but had not subsequently bought the full product. The new demo, however, also contained spy code scanning the user's hard disk for illegal copies of EAGLE. If the program found traces of such, it would show a message indicating that the user was entitled to order a free printed manual using the displayed special order code, which, however, was actually a number encoding the evidence found on the user's machine. Users sending in the filled out form would receive a reply from CadSoft's attorneys. The act of spying, however, was illegal as well by German law.

In 2014, EAGLE 7.0.0 introduced a new Flexera FLEXlm-based licensing model, which wasn't well received by the user community, so that CadSoft returned to the former model of independent perpetual licenses with EAGLE 7.1.0.

Despite announcements to the contrary in 2016, Autodesk switched to a subscription-only licensing model with EAGLE 8.0.0 in January 2017. Without an online connection to a licensing server to verify the licensing status every two weeks (four weeks since version 9.0.0), the software would fall back to the functionality of the freeware version. This caused an uproar in the user community, in particular among those who work in secure or remote environments without direct Internet access and users for whom it is mandatory to be able to gain full access to their designs even after extended periods of time (several years up to decades) without depending on third-parties such as Autodesk to allow reactivation (who may no longer be around or support the product by then). Many users have indicated they would refuse to upgrade under a subscription model and rather migrate to other electronic design applications such as KiCad.

== See also ==
- Comparison of EDA software
- List of free electronics circuit simulators
- Video Disk Recorder (VDR) – another software written by Klaus-Peter Schmidinger
