= P-CAD =

US company founded in 1982

Personal CAD Systems, Inc.
- Industry: Electronic design automation
- Founded: 1982
- Founders: Richard Nedbal, Roy Prasad
- Defunct: 2000
- Headquarters: Los Gatos, California
- Products: P-CAD

P-CAD was the brand name of Personal CAD Systems, Inc., a California-based manufacturer of electronic design automation (EDA) software. It manufactured a CAD software available for personal computers. The company was divested into ACCEL Technologies, which was purchased by Altium in 2000. The last release of the software was in 2006, before it was retired in favor of the Altium Designer product.

== History ==
Personal CAD Systems was founded in 1982 by Richard Nedbal and Roy Prasad. Both were former executives of American Microsystems, Inc. (AMI), a custom semiconductor company based in Santa Clara, California. Also, part of the founding team were Gregory Houston, VP marketing, a former Calma executive, and Chi-Song Horng, director of software engineering (later promoted as a vice president), a former AMI software engineering manager.

P-CAD was a play on personal computers, which were just becoming popular, following the launch of the IBM PC. The vision of the company was to disrupt the existing hegemony of $250,000 CAD systems based on mainframe computers and custom workstations, and make electronic CAD available to the masses at a cost under $10,000. The company originally raised US$500,000 from CrossPoint Venture Partners and US$3,000,000 in a second round from New Enterprise Associates and Robertson, Coleman and Stephens.

P-CAD went on to become the company with the biggest installed base of users of EDA, with over 10,000 users by 1988. At that time, P-CAD was the most prolific EDA company as measured by its user base, easily surpassing established CAD companies such as Autotrol, Calma, Intergraph, Daisy, Mentor, Cadnetix, CAE Systems, ECAD, SDA Systems, etc. At that time, Cadence was just being formed with the merger of ECAD and SGA, and Synopsys was being founded as a new start up.

P-CAD's flagship products included schematic capture, logic simulation and PCB layout. Its single biggest customer was Texas Instruments. In 1989, P-CAD was acquired by Cadam, which was a subsidiary of Lockheed, but was in the process of being sold to IBM. At the time of acquisition, P-CAD had an installed base of over 100,000 end users, a record at that time. A few years later, the P-CAD group was divested by selling to ACCEL Technologies, an EDA software corporation from San Diego, California, which was acquired by Protel International Pty Ltd (now Altium) in 2000. The P-CAD product included schematic capture, component library management, PCB layout and routing, parametric constraint solver and auto-routing capability.

The last version of P-CAD was P-CAD 2006 with Service Pack 2, released in 2006. This was the last release made by Altium, who retired the product in favor of Altium Designer.

== See also ==
- P-CAD Interface for SPECCTRA
