= Pcb-rnd =

Software for layout design of electrical circuits

pcb-rnd
- pcb-rnd running on Linux
- Original authors: Tibor Palinkas, others
- Initial release: 2013; 13 years ago
- Stable release: 3.1.6 / 11 December 2024; 15 months ago
- Written in: C
- Operating system: Unix, Linux, Windows
- Size: 7–12 MB
- Available in: English
- Type: EDA, CAD
- License: GPL 2.0-or-later
- Website: repo.hu/projects/pcb-rnd
- Repository: repo.hu/pcb-rnd/trunk

pcb-rnd is a modular and compact (core under 60k source lines of code (SLOC), plug-ins at 100k SLOC) electronic design automation (EDA) and computer-aided design (CAD) software application used for layout design of electrical circuits. It is used professionally and in universities. Pre-built packages are available on several operating systems. The software focuses on multiple file format support, scripting, multiple font support, a query language and command-line interface support for batch processing and automation. The software provides user interfaces for command line, GTK2+gdk or +gl, GTK4+gl, and Motif supporting multiple graphical user interfaces (GUIs) with the same thing for every interface.

== History ==
pcb-rnd was originally developed from a friendly fork of the geda PCB project. In 2020, pcb-rnd was funded through NGI0 PET as a part of the European Commission's Next Generation Internet program.

A whole EDA suite, named Ringdove, has emerged around pcb-rnd by 2023, featuring a schematics editor (sch-rnd), a gerber–excellon–CAM viewer (camv-rnd), and a PCB autorouter (route-rnd).

== See also ==
- Comparison of EDA software
