= CADSTAR =

Electronic design software

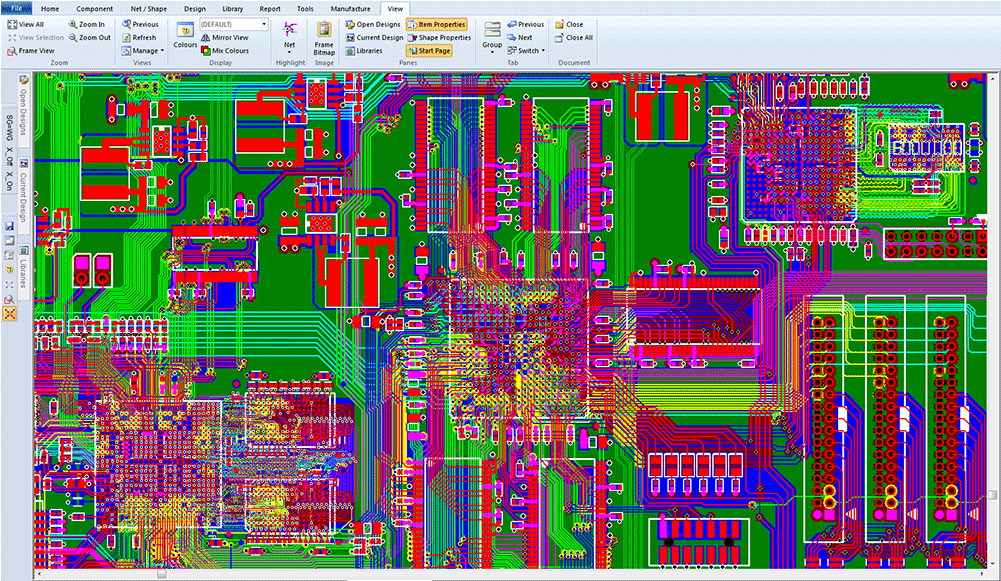
- CADSTAR PCB Design Editor
- Developer: Zuken
- Release: 1987; 39 years ago
- Stable release: 2018 / 1 April 2018; 8 years ago
- Operating system: Windows, MS-DOS (early versions)
- Platform: x86-64, x86
- Available in: English
- Type: ECAD/EDA, CAM
- License: Perpetual
- Website: zuken.com/CADSTAR

CADSTAR is a Windows-based electronic design automation (EDA) software tool for designing and creating schematic diagrams and printed circuit boards (PCBs). It provides engineers with a tool for designing simple or complex, multilayer PCBs. CADSTAR spans schematic capture, variant management, placement, automatic and high-speed routing, signal integrity, power integrity, EMC analysis, design rule checks and production of manufacturing data.

Originally developed by British PCB vendor Racal-Redac, CADSTAR has been part of the Zuken product portfolio since its acquisition in 1994. The software is developed at Zuken's Technology Centre (ZTC) in Bristol.

The basic features of CADSTAR can be tested with the free version of CADSTAR Express. Schematic and PCB files produced by CADSTAR can be reviewed using the free CADSTAR Design Viewer.

== History ==
The first version of CADSTAR was released in late 1987 for MS-DOS. CADSTAR for Windows was released in 1994. Since then, there has been about one major release per year. Zuken subsequently released eCADSTAR in 2019.

== Features ==
CADSTAR contains modules for specific uses:

- Design Editor – This enables the engineer to draw schematic circuits, define the PCB layout and produce the manufacturing data from the completed PCB.
- Library Editor – Used for the creation of Symbols, Component and Parts. Supports ODBC compliant databases.
- Embedded Router – Used to create the tracks (layout) and other copper features of the board within the Design Editor environment.
- P.R.Editor – Used to create the tracks and other copper features of the board in an external environment to the Design Editor with many more features than the Embedded Router.
- High-Speed P.R.Editor – Allows the user to define a wide range of circuit rules and routing constraints to control the layout process.
- Signal Integrity Verify – Post-layout signal integrity simulation toolset and what-if analysis.
- Power Integrity – Fast analysis methodology including what-if analysis for concurrent power integrity.
- EMC Adviser – Helps designers predict, analyse and control EMC design issues.
- Design Migration Tool – Used to migrate designs and libraries from other EDA-tools into CADSTAR.
- Variant Manager – Allows support of variant assemblies for different part values or not fitted components on the same PCB.

== See also ==
- Comparison of EDA software
- List of free electronics circuit simulators
