= Roger Malik =

Physicist, engineer and inventor

Roger John Malik (born August 3, 1954) is a physicist, engineer and inventor.

Malik has worked primarily on the development of high frequency semiconductor device and photovoltaic technologies since the early 1980s. He studied under Lester Eastman at Cornell University. In 2015 he was awarded the status of Fellow of the Institute of Electrical and Electronics Engineers.

== Early years ==
Roger John Malik was born in New Hyde Park, New York on August 3, 1954, one of four children. Malik attended the New Hyde Park Memorial High School.

From a young age, Roger had an innate curiosity about how things worked. In elementary school he reviewed college chemistry and physics textbooks and conducted experiments in his basement with a chemistry set. He studied the electronic circuits in radios, hi-fidelity stereo equipment, and TVs.

Upon the recommendations of his high school math and science teachers, Malik applied and was admitted to the Columbia University Science Honors Program. He attended courses on Fortran computer programming and on laser technology (a recent development at the time) at Columbia University on Saturday mornings during his senior year of high school. These courses cemented his desire to study engineering in college.

== Education and early career ==
Malik studied electrical engineering at Stony Brook University, graduating with a bachelor of engineering degree with high honors in 1976. Experiments for his senior design project were conducted in the laboratory of Prof. George W. Stroke, a pioneer is laser holography. Roger proposed and demonstrated the storage and retrieval of multiple images contained within a single hologram using spatial Fourier Transform analysis. During his junior and senior years, he worked as an intern for Prof. Franklin F.Y. Wang of the Stony Brook Materials Science Department where he performed research on high breakdown voltage, dielectric coatings on silicon power diodes. This was his introduction to semiconductor properties and their underlying device physics.

Roger was admitted to Cornell University and was awarded a Master of Science degree in Electrical Engineering in 1979. Malik joined the Army Research Lab at Fort Monmouth and began doctoral research under Lester Eastman, also at Cornell University. He was awarded a Doctor of Philosophy degree in Electrical Engineering in 1981.

Roger pioneered the concept of Planar Doped Barrier (PDB) diodes and their use in microwave detector and mixer circuits. PDB diodes are unipolar, rectifying diodes typically grown in Gallium arsenide by the precision growth technology of Molecular-beam epitaxy. The PDB diode structure consists of an n-i-p-i-n doping profile in which the ultra-thin (<10 nm) p-doped layer is fully depleted inside the intrinsic layer. This results in a triangular barrier in the electron conduction band wherein the barrier height and degree of asymmetry in the rectifying I-V characteristics are fully designable parameters by varying the p-layer charge and position within the intrinsic layer. Malik invented the PDB diodes during his Ph.D. thesis work conducted at the US Army Electronics Research Laboratories at Fort Monmouth, NJ. The PDB patent was subsequently licensed by the US Army to Hewlett-Packard (now Agilent Technologies) and has been in volume production for over 30 years.

Roger’s work inspired other researchers to invent new types of semiconductor devices using the PDB as a building block. Semiconductor devices including microwave detectors and mixer diodes, subharmonic mixers, RF power limiters, modulated barrier photo-detectors, transferred electron oscillators, vertical-gated FETs, optically triggered thyristors, and hot electron ballistic transistors have all been realized using PDB rectifying barriers in the device design.

Malik is sole inventor on the first patent on PDB technology, US patent #4,410,902, Roger. J. Malik, Planar Doped Barrier Semiconductor Device [10/18/1983].

== Career development ==
Upon graduation from Cornell, Malik took a position at Bell Labs in Murray Hill, NJ. He and his team built upon the Nobel Prize winning work of Herbert Kroemer, who proposed graded band-gap base GaAs heterojunction bipolar transistors for high frequency amplifiers. This work led to widespread commercialization of GaAs transistor amplifiers for mobile phone applications.

While at Bell Labs, Malik invented the use of Carbon acceptor doping in GaAs devices. He demonstrated that Carbon was non-diffusing in the GaAs lattice due to strong tetrahedral bonding of Carbon substituting on the As cites. This greatly improved the long-term reliability of GaAs devices for use in high power GaAs heterojunction bipolar transistor amplifiers, InGaAs high power lasers for optical communication systems, and in GaAs multi-junction solar cells used in satellite power systems.

During his tenure at Bell Labs, he was selected to be a Bell Laboratories Visiting Professor at the Research Center for Advanced Studies (RCAST), at the University of Tokyo. During his stay in Japan, he presented invited lectures and visited over 20 universities and industrial research laboratories engaged in research on compound semiconductor devices.

After 15 years at Bell Labs, Roger founded RJM Semiconductor LLC, a small business that performed contract work for DOD and industry. RJM Semiconductor was awarded government Small Business Innovative Research (SBIR) contracts to further develop Carbon-doped GaAs HBTs for the Air Force, Carbon-doped InP mm-wave HBTs for NASA, GaAs-based MOS transistors for DARPA, and Quantum Cascade Lasers (QCLs) for the Air Force. RJM Semiconductor also developed linear metal evaporation sources for companies in the solar industry (EPV Solar and First Solar) for the inline deposition of CuInGaSe2 thin film solar cells on glass substrates.

Malik made other significant contributions in the area of compound semiconductor devices and materials growth that include high frequency GaAs and InP HBTs amplifiers and digital circuits, GaAs HBTs with base surface passivation for improved reliability, Quantum Well Intersubband Photodetectors (QWIPs), quantum well lasers, LEDs, and infrared photodetectors. Malik’s recent work has focused on research in the growth and characterization of CuInGaSe2 and CdTe thin film solar cells. Malik is currently developing proprietary linear thermal evaporation sources and gas doping techniques aimed towards improving the efficiency and yields of thin film solar cell modules.

Publications in which Malik is a co-author have been cited over 6800 times in technical publications. Malik has an h-index of 41.

Malik has 20 issued US patents.

== Honors and awards ==
Roger was named a Fellow of the Institute of Electrical and Electronics Engineers (IEEE) in 2015 for his contributions to heterojunction compound semiconductor materials and devices.

Other Awards & Fellowships:

- First Solar R&D Achievement Award [“Linear Thermal Evaporation Sources”] (2011)
- NASA Certificate of Recognition [“Heterojunction Bipolar Transistors Utilizing T-shaped Emitter Metal Structures”] (2005)
- AT&T Bell Laboratories Technical Achievement Award [“Quantum Well Inter-Sub-band Photodetectors”] (1988)
- AT&T Bell Laboratories Technical Achievement Award 1986 [“Heterojunction Bipolar Transistors”] (1986)
- U.S. Army Special Act Award [“GaAs Planar Doped Barrier Diodes Grown by Molecular Beam Epitaxy”] (1982)
- First Prize, Paul A. Siple Award - [“GaAs Planar Doped Barrier Diodes Grown by Molecular Beam Epitaxy”] Army Science Conference, West Point, NY, June 15–18 (1982)
- U.S. Army R&D Achievement Award [“GaAs Planar Doped Barrier Diodes”] (1982)
- Rockwell International Fellowship (1977-1978)
