= ICNS =

ICNS can refer to

- Apple Icon Image, uses the extension .icns
- A resource in the resource fork used for icon data
- The International Conference on Nitride Semiconductors
