= Theda Daniels-Race =

American engineer

Theda M. Daniels-Race
- Born: New Orleans, Louisiana
- Education: Rice University, Stanford University, Cornell University
- Parent(s): Valda Marie Daniels; William Mack Daniels
- Scientific career
- Fields: Nanoelectronics, nanotechnology, III-V semiconductors, nanoengineering
- Workplaces: Louisiana State University, Duke University
- Thesis: A spectrometric study of high-energy electrons using planar-doped barrier (PBD) launchers (1990)
- Doctoral advisor: Lester F. Eastman
- Website: www.ece.lsu.edu/tdr/

Theda M. Daniels-Race is an American engineer and Michel B. Voorhies Distinguished Professor in the Division of Electrical and Computer Engineering at Louisiana State University. Her research is in nanoelectronics, specialising in the growth and characterization of nanomaterials and hybrid electronic devices based on compound semiconductors.

== Early life and education ==
Daniels-Race was born in New Orleans, Louisiana on July 8, 1961. Her mother, Valda Marie Daniels, was an elementary school teacher, and her father was a high school math teacher and guidance counselor.

Daniels-Race became very interested in science at a young age, and after a conversation with her parents before she began kindergarten about how long people spend in school, decided at age five that one day she would pursue a Ph.D. to become a scientist.

Daniels-Race attended Dominican High School in New Orleans and graduated salutatorian of her class. With acceptances from Harvard, Princeton, Yale, and other universities, she decided to obtain her undergraduate degree in electrical engineering from Rice University. She completed an MSc in the same discipline from Stanford University funded by a competitive national fellowship.

She was one of the ten students selected for the nationally awarded AT&T Cooperative Research Fellowship Program to pursue her doctorate in electrical engineering at Cornell University with Lester F. Eastman. Daniels-Race's thesis was titled "A spectrometric study of high-energy electrons using planar-doped barrier (PBD) launchers", and her research focused on developing a series of spectrometers based on PBD launchers to observe quantum mechanical phenomena. In her work, she used molecular beam epitaxy to create the semiconductor materials needed to fabricate vertical field effect transistors and demonstrated the first observation of hot electrons and ballistic transport effects in these systems. Likely the first African American woman to earn a PhD in electrical engineering from Cornell, she is also the 19th black female to earn a PhD in physics, astronomy or a related field in the United States.

== Research and career ==
Daniels-Race began her professorial career in the Department of Electrical and Computer Engineering at Duke University, where she established the university's first molecular beam epitaxy laboratory and founded their experimental research programme into III-IV semiconductor materials, with federal funding from the National Science Foundation. She was a visiting scholar at the Microelectronics Research Center at the University Texas Austin. She was awarded funding from the US Department of Energy to investigate the effects of variation in molecular beam epitaxy growth of tensile-strained two-dimensional structures. Her work at Duke was also focused on studying quantum mechanical phenomena such as electron-phonon interactions, and developing microelectronic devices based on GaAs, AlGaAs and InAlAs quantum wells.

In 2003, she joined Louisiana State University as an associate professor in electrical and computer engineering, where she is now a Michel B. Voorhies Distinguished Professor. At LSU, she began a new line of research studying techniques to develop hybrid electronic materials based on compound semiconductor electronics. Her group was awarded funding from the Board of Regents of LSU via the National Science Foundation Links with Industry, Research Centers, and National Laboratories programme (LINK), to pursue work in microelectronics in collaboration with University of Texas at Austin. Her research also focuses on the material growth and optoelectronic characterisation of other low-dimensional nanostructures such as carbon nanotubes and transition metal dichalcogenides. In 2023 Daniels-Race was presented with the Worley Professor of Excellence Award.

During her academic training, Daniels-Race worked with industry partners such as Union Carbide, Exxon Research and Engineering Company, General Electric, and AT&T Bell Laboratories. She is also a member of the advisory board of the Department of Physics and Engineering Physics at Tulane University, an advocate for women in minorities in STEM, and is a member of several professional societies such as the IEEE, the American Physical Society, Materials Research Society, and the National Society of Black Physicists.

Daniels-Race has published a book chapter on the fabrication and design of low-dimensional devices and their applications for the book Nanolithography: The Art of Fabricating Nanoelectronic and Nanophotonic Devices and Systems. She has a combined total of over 100 peer-reviewed journal publications, conference presentations, and science education public lectures.

== Personal life ==
Theda Daniels-Race is married to Paul Race MD, JD, and has two sons.
