= Tomás Palacios =

Tomás Palacios may refer to:

- Tomás Palacios (engineer) (born 1978), Spanish-American engineer
- Tomás Palacios (footballer) (born 2003), Argentine footballer
