= International Conference on Nitride Semiconductors =

- Abbreviation: ICNS
- Discipline: Materials Science Solid State Physics Electronic Engineering

Publication details
- Publisher: Wiley-VCH Physica Status Solidi
- History: 1995–
- Frequency: Biennial

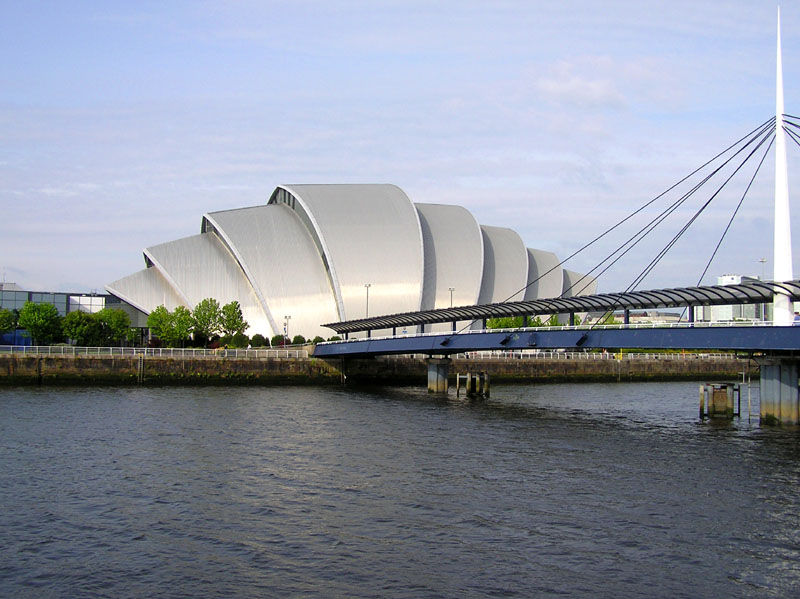
The Scottish Exhibition and Conference Centre in Glasgow, venue for ICNS-9

The International Conference on Nitride Semiconductors (ICNS) is a major academic conference and exhibition in the field of group III nitride research. It has been held biennially since 1995. Since the second conference in 1997, hosting of the event has rotated between the Asian and the European continent and the United States of America. The ICNS and the International Workshop on Nitride Semiconductors (IWN) are held in alternating years, both covering similar subject areas.

ICNS-9 was held at the Scottish Exhibition and Conference Centre in Glasgow, Scotland, on 10–15 July 2011. Keynote speakers included Professor Umesh Mishra (University of California Santa Barbara and Transphorm) and Professor Hiroshi Amano (Meijo University, Nagoya). ICNS-10 was held in Washington, D.C., United States on 25–30 August 2013, ICNS-11 was held in Beijing, China 30 August–4 September 2015 and ICNS-12 was held in Strasbourg, France on 24–28 July 2017.

ICNS-13 was held 7-12 July 2019 in Seattle, Washington, United States, and was chaired by Alan Doolittle (Georgia Institute of Technology, USA)

The ICNS-14 was held in Fukuoka, Japan, from 12-17 November 2023. The conference had a total number of 1241 participants. 424 oral presentations were given and 407 posters presented. Plenary talks were given by Hiroshi Amano (Nagoya University, Japan), Debdeep Jena (Cornell University, USA), Elison Matioli (EPFL, Switzerland), Takashi Mukai (Nichia Corp, Japan), Åsa Haglund (Chalmers University of Technology, Sweden), Aurélien David (Google, USA), Ken Nakata (Sumitomo Electric Industries Ltd., Japan).

The ICNS-15 will be held in Malmö, Sweden from 6-11 July 2025. ICNS-15 will present high-impact scientific and technological advances in materials and devices based on group-III nitride semiconductors, and feature plenary sessions, parallel topical sessions, poster sessions and an industrial exhibition. ICNS-15 will celebrate the achievements of Profs. Bo Monemar and Tadek Suski as honorary chairs. Conference chairs are Vanya Darakchieva (Lund University), Piotr Perlin (Center for High Pressure Research at the Polish Academy of Sciences (Unipress), Warsaw, Poland) and Lars Samuelson (Lund University, Sweden and Southern University of Science and Technology (SUSTech), Shenzhen, China).

== Conference list ==
| Conference name | Location | Dates |
|---|---|---|
| ICNS-15 | Malmö, Sweden | 6-11 July 2025 |
| ICNS-14 | Fukuoka, Japan | 12-17 November 2023 |
| ICNS-13 | Bellevue, Washington, Seattle’s Eastside, United States | 7–12 July 2019 |
| ICNS-12 | Strasbourg, France | 24–28 July 2017 |
| ICNS-11 | Beijing, China | 30 August – 4 September 2015 |
| ICNS-10 | Washington D.C., United States | 25–30 August 2013 |
| ICNS-9 | (United Kingdom) Glasgow, UK | 10–15 July 2011 |
| ICNS-8 | (South Korea) Jeju, Korea | 18–23 October 2009 |
| ICNS-7 | Las Vegas, United States | 16–21 September 2007 |
| ICNS-6 | Bremen, Germany | 28 August – 2 September 2005 |
| ICNS-5 | Nara, Japan | 25–30 May 2003 |
| ICNS-4 | Denver, United States | 16–20 July 2001 |
| ICNS-3 | Montpellier, France | 4–9 July 1999 |
| ICNS-2 | Tokushima, Japan | 27–31 October 1997 |
| TWN'95 | Nagoya, Japan | 21–23 September 1995 |

== See also ==
- Gallium nitride
- Indium nitride
- Aluminium nitride
- Boron nitride (hexagonal form)
