= Srabanti Chowdhury =

Indian-born American Electrical Engineer

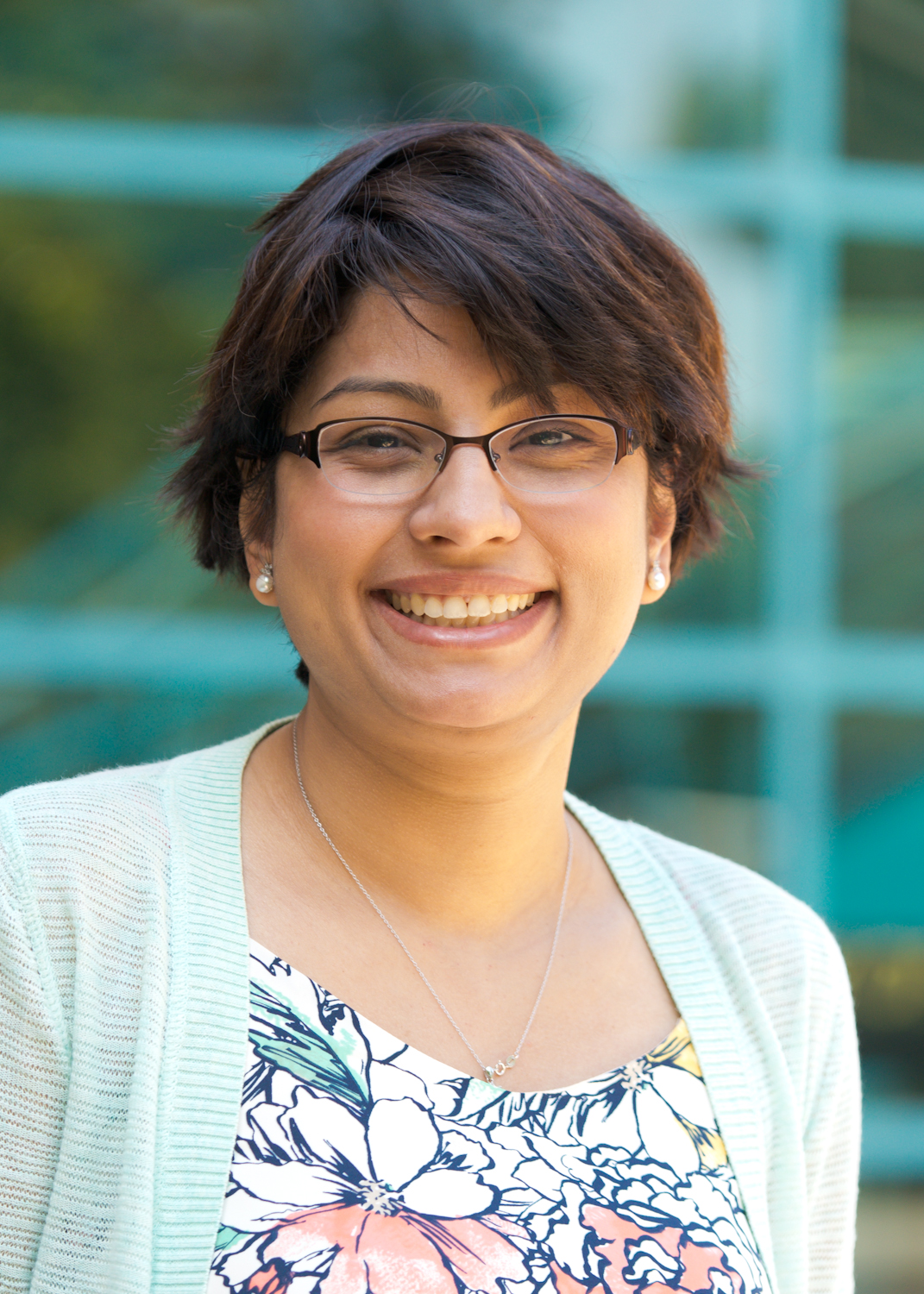
- Education: University of California, Santa Barbara; University of Calcutta
- Awards: IEEE Fellow; 2023 SRC Technical Excellence Award, by Semiconductor Research Corporation; Sloan Research Fellowship; DARPA Young Faculty Award; AFOSR Young Investigator Program Award; National Science Foundation CAREER Award
- Scientific career
- Workplaces: Stanford University
- Thesis: AlGaN/GaN CAVETs for high power switching application (Dec 2010 PhD. advisor: Prof. Umesh Mishra)
- Website: profiles.stanford.edu/srabanti-chowdhury

Srabanti Chowdhury is an Indian American Electrical Engineer who is a professor of electrical engineering at Stanford University. She is a senior fellow of the Precourt Institute for Energy. At Stanford she works on ultra-wide and wide-bandgap semiconductors and device engineering for energy-efficient electronic devices. She serves as Director for Science Collaborations at the United States Department of Energy Energy Frontier Research Center ULTRA.

== Early life and education ==
Chowdhury earned her bachelor's degree in radiophysics and electronics at the University of Calcutta Institute of Radiophysics and Electronics. After earning her undergraduate degree, she worked in the corporate sector in Bangalore. She eventually decided to pursue a doctorate, and moved to the United States. She was a graduate student at the University of California, Santa Barbara, where she worked alongside Umesh Mishra. During her doctoral research, she developed vertical gallium nitride (GaN) devices for power conversion. She was the first to realize a current aperture vertical electron transistor, a high voltage vertical power switching device based on GaN. These single crystal GaN devices achieved a record-high breakdown electric field. After earning her doctorate, she joined Transphorm, a company that looked to commercialize GaN devices.

== Research and career ==
Chowdhury leads the WBG Lab at Stanford University. Chowdhury dedicated her early research to the creation of very low loss transistors for power conversion applications. Building upon her doctoral research, she identified and optimized fabrication processes to create GaN vertical devices. Her fabrication makes use of the interesting polarization characteristics of GaN. Reverse polarization of Aluminum Gallium Nitride/GaN heterostructure blocks current, whilst allowing very high current flow to specific regions. Her work offers hope for high power density, high efficiency electronic devices. Alongside GaN, Chowdhury has investigated diamond for passive electronics.

Chowdhury serves as Director for Science Collaborations at the United States Department of Energy Energy Frontier Research Center ULTRA (Ultra Materials for a Resilient, Smart Electricity Grid).

== Awards and honors ==
- IEEE Fellow for contribution to wide bandgap device technology -2024
- SRC Technical Excellence Award for her contribution to heat spreading by Diamond deposition on GaN and on SiC with low thermal boundary resistance - 2023 https://www.src.org/award/tech-excellence/2023
- DARPA Young Faculty Award
- National Science Foundation CAREER Award
- AFOSR Young Investigator Program
- International Symposium on Compound Semiconductors Young Scientist Award
- Sloan Research Fellowship
- National Academy of Engineering Frontiers of Engineering

== Selected publications ==
- Tsao, J. Y.; Chowdhury, S.; Hollis, M. A.; Jena, D.; Johnson, N. M.; Jones, K. A.; Kaplar, R. J.; Rajan, S.; Van de Walle, C. G.; Bellotti, E.; Chua, C. L. (2018). "Ultrawide-Bandgap Semiconductors: Research Opportunities and Challenges". Advanced Electronic Materials. 4 (1) 1600501. doi:10.1002/aelm.201600501. ISSN 2199-160X. S2CID 38628999.
- Chowdhury, Srabanti; Mishra, Umesh K (2013). "Lateral and Vertical Transistors Using the AlGaN/GaN Heterostructure". IEEE Transactions on Electron Devices. 60 (10): 3060–3066. Bibcode:2013ITED...60.3060C. doi:10.1109/ted.2013.2277893. ISSN 0018-9383. S2CID 24307058.
- Chowdhury, Srabanti; Swenson, Brian L.; Mishra, Umesh K. (2008). "Enhancement and Depletion Mode AlGaN/GaN CAVET With Mg-Ion-Implanted GaN as Current Blocking Layer". IEEE Electron Device Letters. 29 (6): 543–545. Bibcode:2008IEDL...29..543C. doi:10.1109/led.2008.922982. ISSN 0741-3106. S2CID 20040366.
