= IWN =

IWN may refer to:

- Israel Women's Network
- Indigenous Women's Network
- International Workshop on Nitride Semiconductors
- Inland Waterway News
