= Gabriel Delafosse =

French mineralogist (1796–1878)

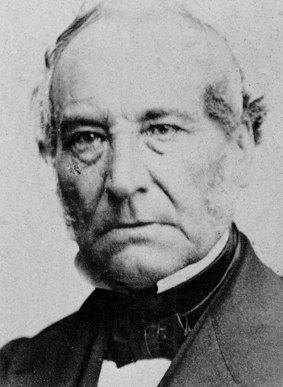

Signature
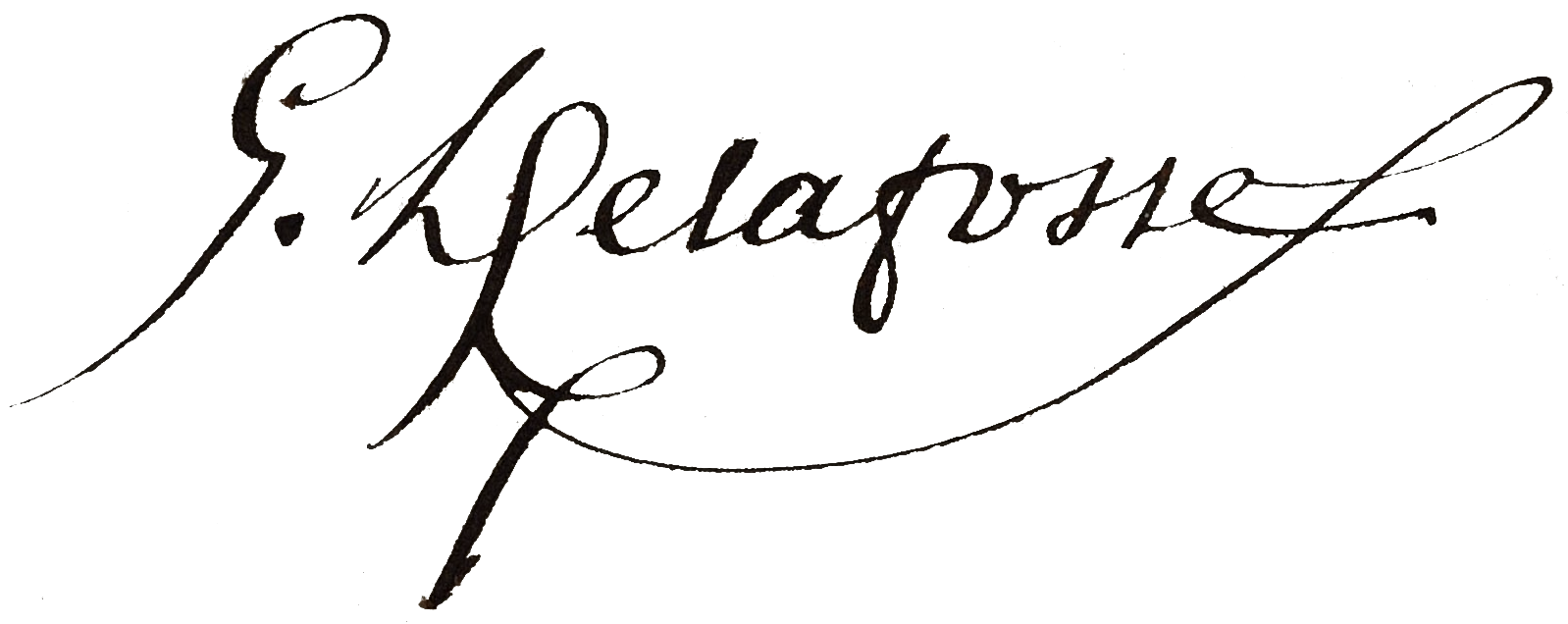

Gabriel Delafosse (16 April 1796 – 13 October 1878) was a French mineralogist who worked at the Natural History Museum in Paris and for sometime at the University of Paris. He contributed to development of the idea of unit cells in crystallography. The mineral Delafossite is named after him. He was one of the founding members of the Société Geologique de France.

== Biography ==
Delafosse was born in Saint-Quentin, the son of a magistrate. He was educated locally and at Rheims before joining the École Normal Supérieure and then went to work at the Museum of Natural History from 1816 under René Just Haüy. After Haüy's death he published posthumously some notes on crystallography and mineralogy in volumes of Traité de minéralogie (1822-1823). He defended his thesis in crystallography on hemihedry (hemihedral shape of a crystal) in 1840. He was an assistant was the chair of mineralogy at the Mineralogy Laboratory of the National Museum of Natural History in Paris, in 1857, then joined the Faculty of Science from 1822, teaching at the École Normale Supérieure from 1826, becoming a professor in 1841 and working until 1876. Delafosse was a founding member of the Société Geologique de France.

Delafosse showed that one had to distinguish the "integrating molecule" of Haüy from the chemical molecule. He proposed the concept of "maille" (Unit cell) in crystallography.

In line with his works are those of his student Louis Pasteur on molecular dissymmetry.

A mineral species was dedicated to him by Charles Friedel in 1873, the delafossite, composed of copper and iron oxide.

== Publications ==
- Précis élémentaire d'histoire naturelle, Hachette, 1833.
- De la structure des cristaux, considérés comme base de la distinction et de la classification des systèmes cristallins. Sur l'importance de l'étude de la symétrie dans les différentes branches de l'Histoire naturelle, et en particulier dans la morphologie végétale et animale, Thèse de sciences, Université de Paris, 1840.
- Recherches sur la cristallisation considérée sous les rapports physiques et mathématiques, in Mémoires de l'Académie des sciences de Paris, tome viii des savants étrangers, 1843.
- Nouveau cours de minéralogie, 1858.
- Rapport sur les progrès de la minéralogie, in Recueil de rapports sur les progrès des lettres et des sciences en France, Paris, 1867. (According to F. Dagognet, Méthodes et doctrine dans l'œuvre de Pasteur, Paris, 1967, reprinted under the title Pasteur sans la légende, 1994, p. 57, n. 2, this report includes a luminous exposition of the '"History of crystallography and its problems".)

In collaboration

- Bulletin des sciences naturelles et de géologie
- Bulletin universel des sciences et de l'industrie
- Historiæ naturalis: libri XXXVII

== Bibliography ==
- François Dagognet, Méthodes et doctrine dans l'œuvre de Pasteur, Paris, 1967, reprinted under the title Pasteur sans la légende, 1994, p. 25-144, passim.
- Henk Kubbinga (dir.), L'histoire du concept de « molécule », t. 3, Springer, 2001, passim. (Partially online.)
- Philippe Jaussaud and Édouard-Raoul Brygoo, Du Jardin au Muséum en 516 biographies, Publications scientifiques du Muséum, biography of Gabriel Delafosse, online.

== See also ==
- Chemical crystallography before X-rays
- Geometrical crystallography before X-rays
