= Autotrax =

Software for MS-DOS

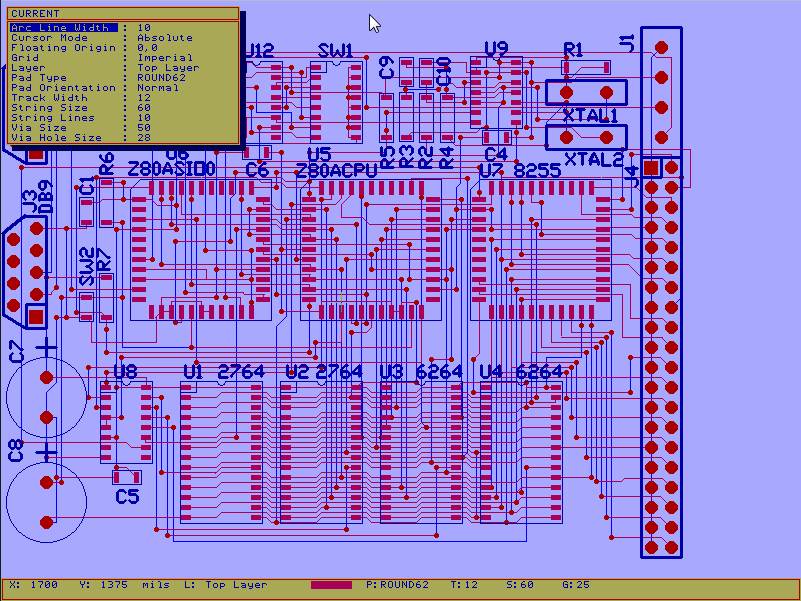
- Version 1.61ND running in a virtual machine (VM) on Windows 7
- Original author: Protel International Pty. Ltd. (now Altium Ltd.)
- Release: 1985; 41 years ago (as Protel PCB); 1988; 38 years ago (as Autotrax)
- Final release: 1.61 / 1991; 35 years ago (as Autotrax)
- Operating system: MS-DOS
- Platform: IBM PC compatibles
- Type: EDA
- License: Commercial proprietary
- Website: techdocs.altium.com/display/ALEG/Legacy+Downloads

Autotrax is a software application for MS-DOS. It was designed by Protel Systems, now Altium, and was one of the first professional printed circuit board computer-aided design (CAD) applications available for IBM PC compatibles. It was also sold in a version with fewer features as Easytrax. Both later became freeware.

== History ==
Tango PCB logo

In 1985, Protel Systems shipped the PCB design toolProtel PCB for MS-DOS, which was sold only in Australia. Protel PCB was marketed internationally by HST Technology since 1986. In October 1986 the San Diego–based ACCEL Technologies acquired marketing and support responsibilities of the PCB program for the US, Canada and Mexico under the name Tango PCB. combining it with their own Tango Route. In 1987, Protel launched the circuit diagram editor Protel Schematic for DOS.

In 1988 the company launched Autotrax for DOS in the US as well. A stripped-down version of Autotrax was marketed as Easytrax. Autotrax was sold throughout the world until the company ported the application to Windows 3.1 to create the first Windows-based PCB CAD tool, Protel Advanced Schematic/PCB 1.0 for Windows in 1991, which was the forerunner to the software Altium Designer.

== Overview ==
Protel Autotrax runs on MS-DOS. It will run on Windows 98 and XP but only as a console window. The program is mainly keystroke driven but to aid memorization a menu appears in the upper left corner of the screen whenever a command is issued. Selection of elements within the circuit board is accomplished almost exclusively by using the mouse. These apparent limits mean that users quickly became good at driving the program and disinclined to change to anything newer and, in practice, slower.

The native file format for Autotrax is PCB File 4. Protel also produced a less expensive, cut-down package called Easytrax. This was later made available free, while Autrotrax still required a license; now both are free. Easytrax is identified by "PCB File 5" in its file headers and differs primarily in not allocating hole sizes to pads. The native file format for Autotrax and Easytrax is based on 1 mil (0.001 inch) increments, although the package shows measurements in millimetres if metric is selected. The native file format allows for most of the information needed to manufacture basic PCBs except that it does not allow for non-plated-through holes. This is because a de facto industry standard has emerged which assumes that if a pad is smaller than its associated hole, the hole is not plated through, while Autotrax will only permit pads that are at least 2 mil larger than the hole diameter.

Two bugs in the Protel Autotrax format have to do with octagonal pads, which on inspection can be seen to be not quite regular octagons, and string sizes. In Autotrax, string sizes are only ever displayed in multiples of 12 mil, so specification of a string size as something other than a multiple of 12 mil may lead to incorrect import into another package.

Many PCB manufacturers in Australia and some PCB manufacturers in Asia will still accept boards in native Protel Autotrax format rather than requiring export to PCB industry standard Gerber format. Autotrax will run in a DOS window under Windows 9x and Windows NT up to XP. It does not run on Windows Vista and later, but can be run successfully using generic VESA video drivers in a DOS virtual machine.
