= International Workshop on Nitride Semiconductors =

- Abbreviation: IWN
- Discipline: Materials Science Solid State Physics Electronic Engineering

Publication details
- Publisher: Wiley-VCH Physica Status Solidi
- History: 2000–
- Frequency: Biennial

The International Workshop on Nitride Semiconductors (IWN) is a biennial academic conference in the field of group III nitride research. The IWN and the International Conference on Nitride Semiconductors (ICNS) are held in alternating years and cover similar subject areas. IWN is pioneered by Isamu Akasaki (Nagoya University, Meijo University) and Hiroshi Amano (Nagoya University), who are Nobel laureates in physics (2014)

- IWN2018 was held 11–16 November 2018 in Kanazawa, Japan, and chaired by Hiroshi Fujioka (the University of Tokyo, Japan)

- IWN2016 was held 2–7 October 2016 in Orlando, United States, and jointly chaired by Alan Doolittle (Georgia Institute of Technology and Tomás Palacios (Massachusetts Institute of Technology, USA)

- IWN2012 was held 14–19 October 2012 in Sapporo, Japan and chaired by Hiroshi Amano (Nagoya University, Japan).

== Conference list ==
Conference name	Location	Dates
IWN2024	(United States) Honolulu, USA	3-8 November 2024
IWN2022	Berlin, Germany	9–14 October 2022
IWN2018	Kanazawa, Japan	11–16 November 2018
IWN2016	Orlando, United States	2–8 October 2016
IWN2014	Wrocław, Poland	24–29 August 2014
IWN2012	Sapporo, Japan	14–19 October 2012
IWN2010	Tampa, United States	19–24 September 2010
IWN2008	Montreux, Switzerland	6–10 October 2008
IWN2006	Kyoto, Japan	22–27 October 2006
IWN2004	(United States) Pittsburgh, USA	19–23 July 2004
IWN2002	Aachen, Germany	22–25 July 2002
IWN2000	Nagoya, Japan	24–27 September 2000

== See also ==
- Gallium nitride
- Indium nitride
- Aluminium nitride
- Boron nitride
