= Delafossite =

Copper iron oxide mineral

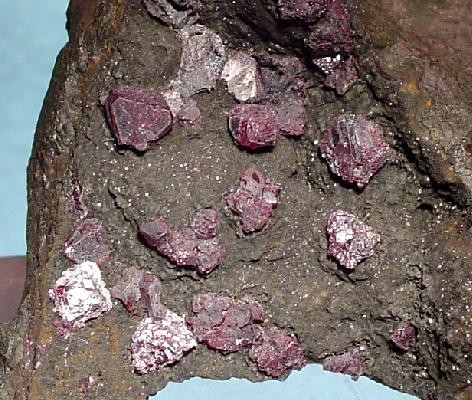
- Discrete, wine-red cuprite crystals on matrix covered by brightly reflective delafossite microcrystals

General
- Category: Oxide minerals
- Formula: CuFeO_{2}
- IMA symbol: Del
- Strunz classification: 4.AB.15
- Crystal system: Trigonal
- Crystal class: Hexagonal scalenohedral (3̅m); H-M symbol: (3̅ 2/m)
- Space group: R3̅m
- Unit cell: a = 3.04, c = 17.12 [Å]; Z = 3

Identification
- Color: Black
- Crystal habit: Tabular to equant crystals; botryoidal crusts, spherulitic, powdery, massive
- Twinning: Contact twins on {0001}
- Cleavage: Imperfect on {101̅1}
- Tenacity: Brittle
- Mohs scale hardness: 5.5
- Luster: Metallic
- Streak: Black
- Diaphaneity: Opaque
- Specific gravity: 5.41
- Optical properties: Uniaxial
- Pleochroism: Distinct; O = pale golden brown; E = rose-brown
- Other characteristics: Weakly magnetic

Delafossite is a copper iron oxide mineral with formula CuFeO_{2} or Cu^{1+}Fe^{3+}O_{2}. It is a member of the delafossite mineral group, which has the general formula ABO_{2}, a group characterized by sheets of linearly coordinated A cations stacked between edge-shared octahedral layers (BO_{6}). Delafossite, along with other minerals of the ABO_{2} group, is known for its wide range of electrical properties, its conductivity varying from insulating to metallic. Delafossite is usually a secondary mineral that crystallizes in association with oxidized copper and rarely occurs as a primary mineral.

== Composition ==
The chemical formula for delafossite is CuFeO_{2}, which was first determined through chemical analysis of the pure mineral by G. S. Bohart. The ratio he determined was very close to Cu:Fe:O=1:1:2, with slightly more iron than copper. Rogers. attributed this fact to a small amount of hematite in the sample. In order to determine the composition of delafossite Rogers used the Ziervogel process. The Ziervogel process is used to test for the presence of cuprous oxides by looking for the "spangle reaction" which produces thin flakes of metallic silver when cuprous oxide is mixed with silver sulfate. When Rogers heated powdered delafossite with silver sulfate solution, the spangle reaction occurred. The only oxides possibilities to consider for delafossite are cuprous copper and ferrous iron. Rogers concluded that the iron was combining with the oxygen as a radical and that it only acted as a radical. This indicated that the copper in delafossite was in the cuprous rather than the cupric form. Hence he concluded that the composition of delafossite was probably cuprous metaferrite, CuFe^{3+}O_{2}. This composition was later confirmed by Pabst by the determination of interionic distances in the crystal lattice.

== Structure ==
The atomic structure of delafossite and the delafossite group consists of a sheet of linearly coordinated A cations stacked between edge-shared octahedral layers (BO_{6}). In the delafossite atomic structure there are two alternating planar layers. The two layers consist of one layer triangular-patterned A cations and a layer of edge-sharing BO_{6} octahedra compacted with respect to the c axis. The delafossite structure can have two polytypes according to the orientation of the planar layer stacking. Hexagonal 2H types that have a space group of P6_{3}/mmc are formed when two A layers are stacked with each layer rotated 180° in relation to one another. Alternatively, when the layers are stacked each layer in the same direction in relation to one another, it makes a rhombohedral 3R type with a space group of R3̅m.

== Physical properties ==
The color of delafossite is black, with a hardness of 5.5, and imperfect cleavage in the {101̅1} direction. Pabst calculated the density of delafossite to be 5.52. Contact twinning has been observed in the {0001} direction. The unit cell parameters were calculated to be a = 3.0351 Å, c = 17.166 Å, V = 136.94 Å^{3}. Delafossite is tabular to equidimensional in habit and has a black streak and a metallic luster. Delafossite has hexagonal symmetry that can have the space groups R3̅m or P6_{3}/mmc depending on the stacking of A cation layers. Delafossite compounds can have magnetic properties when magnetic ions are in the B cation position. Delafossite compounds also have properties dealing with electric conductivity such as insulation and/or metallic conduction. Delafossite compounds can exhibit p- or n-type conductivity based on their composition.

Rhombohedral (3R), CuFeO_{2} properties:

- P-type semiconductor, bandgap 1.47 eV
- High light absorption coefficient of 7.5×10^{4} cm^{−1} near the band gap edge at 700 nm.
- High hole mobility of 34 cm^{2} v^{−1} s^{−1} even at doping levels as high as 1.8 × 10^{19} cm^{−3}.
- Good stability in aqueous environments.

Hexagonal (2H), CuFeO_{2} properties:

- unknown as pure 2H CuFeO_{2} is very difficult to synthesize.

== Synthesis ==
3R CuFeO_{2} is often synthesized by solid state reactions, sol gel methods, vapor deposition, and hydrothermal synthesis.

Pure 2H CuFeO_{2} and other 2H delafossite-type oxides are difficult to synthesize. The only pure 2H CuFeO_{2} crystals were pure 2H CuFeO_{2} nanoplates with a thickness of about 100 nm which were synthesized at temperatures as low as 100 °C from CuI and FeCl_{3}·6H_{2}O.

== Application ==
Solar cells: 2H CuFeO_{2} has a band gap of 1.33 eV and a high absorption coefficient of 3.8×10^{4} cm^{−1} near the band gap edge at 700 nm. It demonstrated a photovoltaic effect when placed into thin film structures composed of ITO/ZnO/2H CuFeO_{2}/graphite/carbon black.

Other applications: CuFeO_{2} is made of earth abundant elements and has good stability in aqueous environments, and as such was investigated as photocathodes for photoelectrochemical reduction of CO_{2}, solar water reduction, and as a cathode material in lithium batteries. Whereas the 3R phase was somewhat characterized, only X-ray diffraction and theoretical calculation of e_{g} and t_{2g} occupancies of the Fe^{3+} are available for 2H CuFeO_{2}.

== Geologic occurrence ==
In 1873, delafossite was discovered by Charles Friedel in a region of Ekaterinbug, Ural Mountains. Since its discovery it has been identified as a fairly common mineral found in such places as the copper mines of Bisbee, Arizona. Delafossite is usually a secondary mineral often found in oxidized areas of copper deposits although it can be a primary mineral as well. Delafossite can be found as massive, relatively distinct crystals on hematite. Delafossite has since been found in mines around the world from Germany to Chile.

== Origin of the name ==
Delafossite was first noted by Charles Friedel in 1873 and given the composition Cu_{2}O·Fe_{2}O_{3}. The mineral was given the name delafossite in honor of the French mineralogist and crystallographer Gabriel Delafosse (1796–1878). Delafosse is known for noting the close relationship between crystal symmetry and physical properties.

== See also ==
- List of minerals
- List of minerals named after people
- I-III-VI semiconductors
