= I-III-VI semiconductors =

Solid semiconducting materials

I-III-VI_{2} semiconductors are solid semiconducting materials that contain three or more chemical elements belonging to groups I, III and VI (IUPAC groups 1/11, 13 and 16) of the periodic table. They usually involve two metals and one chalcogen. Some of these materials have a direct bandgap, E_{g}, of approximately 1.5 eV, which makes them efficient absorbers of sunlight and thus potential solar cell materials. A fourth element is often added to a I-III-VI_{2} material to tune the bandgap for maximum solar cell efficiency. A representative example is copper indium gallium selenide (CuIn_{x}Ga_{(1−x)}Se_{2}, E_{g} = 1.7–1.0 eV for x = 0–1), which is used in copper indium gallium selenide solar cells.

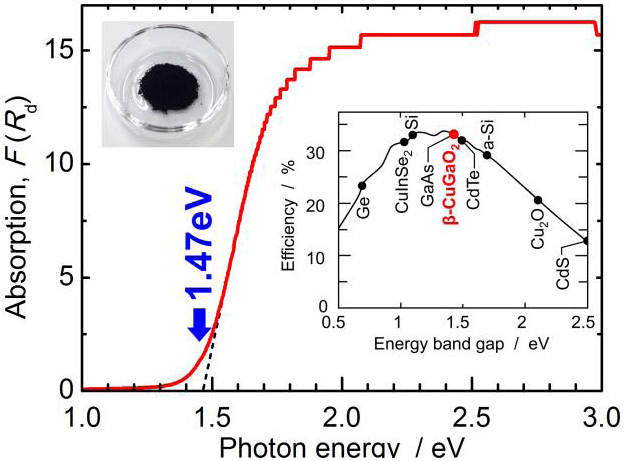
Optical absorption spectrum of β-CuGaO_{2} powder (top left inset) obtained from diffuse reflection measurements. The right inset shows the Shockley–Queisser limit for the efficiency of a single-junction solar cell under unconcentrated sunlight.

== CuGaO_{2} ==
CuGaO_{2} exists in two main polymorphs, α and β. The α form has the delafossite crystal structure and can be prepared by reacting Cu_{2}O with Ga_{2}O_{3} at high temperatures. The β form has a wurtzite-like crystal structure (space group Pna2_{1}); it is metastable, but exhibits a long-term stability at temperatures below 300 °C. It can be obtained by an ion exchange of Na^{+} ions in a β-NaGaO_{2} precursor with Cu^{+} ions in CuCl under vacuum, to avoid the oxidation of Cu^{+} to Cu^{2+}.

Unlike most I-III-VI_{2} oxides, which are transparent, electrically insulating solids with a bandgap above 2 eV, β-CuGaO_{2} has a direct bandgap of 1.47 eV, which is favorable for solar cell applications. In contrast, β-AgGaO_{2} and β-AgAlO_{2} have an indirect bandgap. Undoped β-CuGaO_{2} is a p-type semiconductor.

== AgGaO_{2} and AgAlO_{2} ==
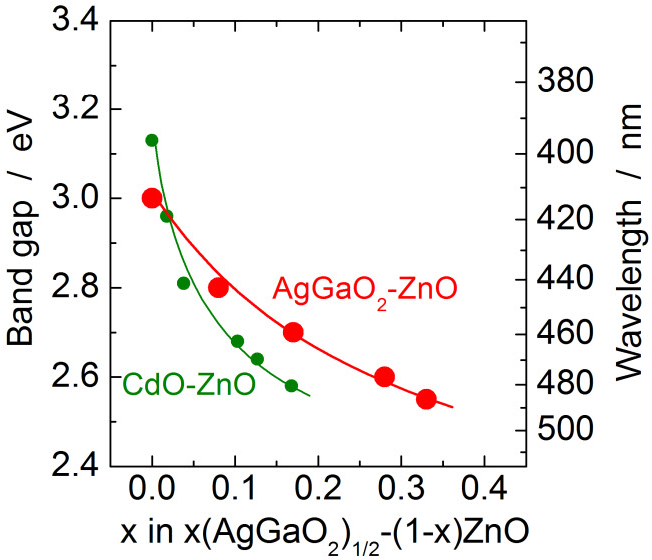
Bandgap in AgGaO_{2}–ZnO and CdO–ZnO alloys

Similarly to CuGaO_{2}, α-AgGaO_{2} and α-AgAlO_{2} have the delafossite crystal structure while the structure of the corresponding β phases is similar to wurtzite (space group Pna2a). β-AgGaO_{2} is metastable and can be synthesized by ion exchange with a β-NaGaO_{2} precursor. The bandgaps of β-AgGaO_{2} and β-AgAlO_{2} (2.2 and 2.8 eV respectively) are indirect; they fall into the visible range and can be tuned by alloying with ZnO. For this reason, both materials are hardly suitable for solar cells, but have potential applications in photocatalysis.

Contrary to LiGaO_{2}, AgGaO_{2} can not be alloyed with ZnO by heating their mixture because of the Ag^{+} reduction to metallic silver; therefore, magnetron sputtering of AgGaO_{2} and ZnO targets is used instead.

== LiGaO_{2} and LiGaTe_{2} ==
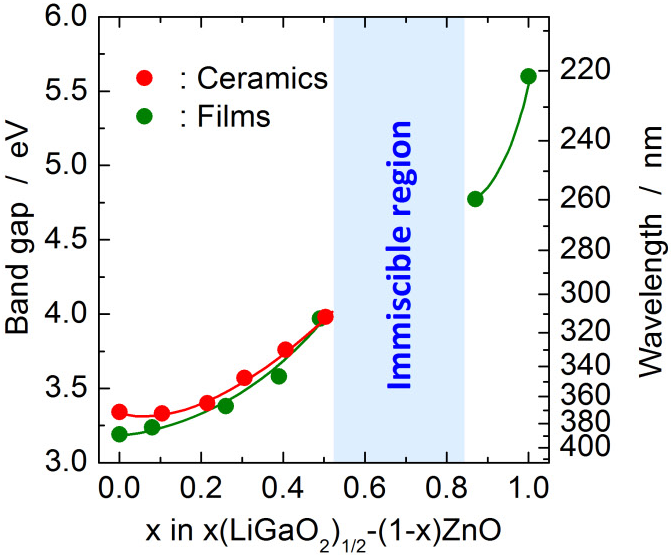
Bandgap in LiGaO_{2}–ZnO alloys

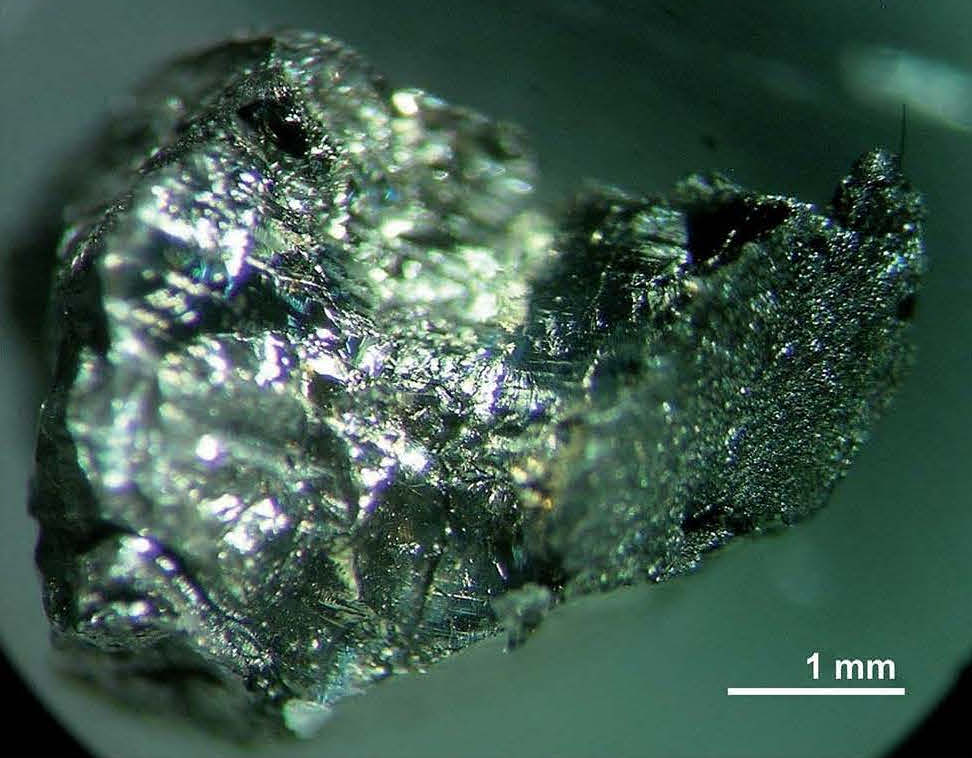
LiGaTe_{2} crystal

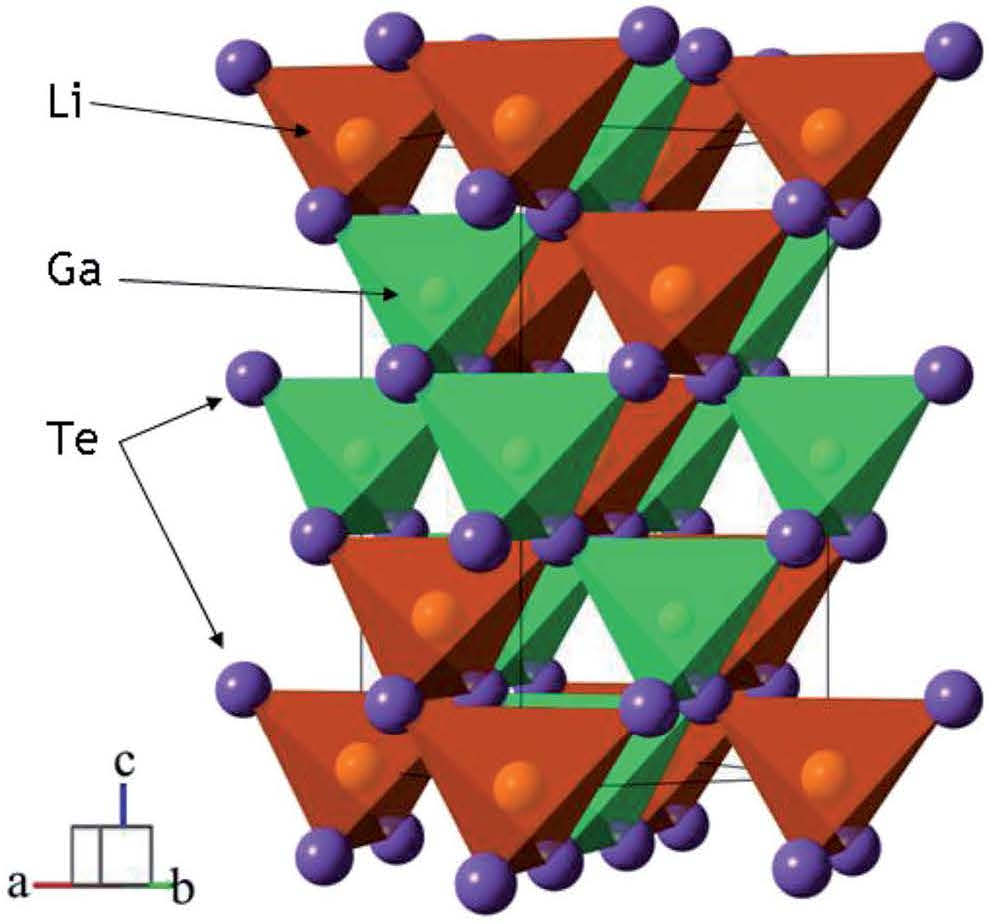
LiGaTe_{2} crystal structure

Pure single crystals of β-LiGaO_{2} with a length of several inches can be grown by the Czochralski method. Their cleaved surfaces have lattice constants that match those of ZnO and GaN and are therefore suitable for epitaxial growth of thin films of those materials. β-LiGaO_{2} is a potential nonlinear optics material, but its direct bandgap of 5.6 eV is too wide for visible light applications. It can be reduced down to 3.2 eV by alloying β-LiGaO_{2} with ZnO. The bandgap tuning is discontinuous because ZnO and β-LiGaO_{2} do not mix but form a Zn_{2}LiGaO_{4} phase when their ratio is between ca. 0.2 and 1.

LiGaTe_{2} crystals with a size up to 5 mm can be grown in three steps. First, Li, Ga, and Te elements are fused in an evacuated quartz ampoule at 1250 K for 24 hours. At this stage Li reacts with the ampoule walls, releasing heat, and is partly consumed. In the second stage, the melt is homogenized in a sealed quartz ampoule, which is coated inside with pyrolytic carbon to reduce Li reactivity. The homogenization temperature is selected ca. 50 K above the melting point of LiGaTe_{2}. The crystals are then grown from the homogenized melt by the Bridgman–Stockbarger method in a two-zone furnace. The temperature at the start of crystallization is a few degrees below the LiGaTe_{2} melting point. The ampoule is moved the cold zone at a rate of 2.5 mm/day for 20 days.

Room-temperature properties of I-III-VI_{2} semiconductors
Formula	a (Å)	b (Å)	c (Å)	Space group	Density (g/cm^{3})	Melting point (K)	Bandgap (eV)
α-LiGaO_{2}	2.92	2.92	14.45	R3̅m	5.07	m	5.6d
β-LiGaO_{2}	5.406	6.379	5.013	Pna2_{1}	4.18	m	5.6d
LiGaSe_{2}				Pna2_{1}			
LiGaTe_{2}	6.33757(2)	6.33757(2)	11.70095(5)	I4̅3d		940	2.41
LiInTe_{2}	6.398	6.398	12.46	I4̅2d	4.91		1.5
CuAlS_{2}	5.323	5.323	10.44	I4̅2d	3.47	2500	2.5
CuAlSe_{2}	5.617	5.617	10.92	I4̅2d	4.70	2260	2.67
CuAlTe_{2}	5.976	5.976	11.80	I4̅2d	5.50	2550	0.88
β-CuGaO_{2}	5.46004(1)	6.61013(2)	5. 27417(1)	Pna2_{1}		m	1.47d
CuGaS_{2}	5.360	5.360	10.49	I4̅2d	4.35	2300	2.38
CuGaSe_{2}	5.618	5.618	11.01	I4̅2d	5.56	1970	0.96; 1.63
CuGaTe_{2}	6.013	6.013	11.93	I4̅2d	5.99	2400	0.82; 1.0
CuInS_{2}	5.528	5.528	11.08	I4̅2d	4.75	1400	1.2
CuInSe_{2}	5.785	5.785	11.56	I4̅2d	5.77	1600	0.86; 0.92
CuInTe_{2}	6.179	6.179	12.365	I4̅2d	6.10	1660	0.95
CuTlS_{2}	5.58	5.58	11.17	I4̅2d	6.32		
CuTlSe_{2}	5.844	5.844	11.65	I4̅2d	7.11	900	1.07
CuFeO_{2}	3.035	3.035	17.166	R3̅m	5.52		
CuFeS_{2}	5.29	5.29	10.32	I4̅2d	4.088	1135	0.53
CuFeSe_{2}	5.544	5.544	11.076	P4̅2c	5.41	850	0.16
CuLaS_{2}	5.65	5.65	10.86	I4̅2d			
β-AgAlO_{2}						m	2.8i
AgAlS_{2}	5.707	5.707	10.28	I4̅2d	3.94		
AgAlSe_{2}	5.986	5.986	10.77	I4̅2d	5.07	1220	0.7
AgAlTe_{2}	6.309	6.309	11.85	I4̅2d	6.18	1000	0.56
α-AgGaO_{2}				P6_{3}mc			4.12d
β-AgGaO_{2}				Pna2a		m	2.2i
AgGaS_{2}	5.755	5.755	10.28	I4̅2d	4.72		1.66
AgGaSe_{2}	5.985	5.985	10.90	I4̅2d	5.84	1120	1.1
AgGaTe_{2}	6.301	6.301	11.96	I4̅2d	6.05	990	1.32
AgInS_{2}	5.828	5.828	11.19	I4̅2d	5.00		1.18
AgInSe_{2}	6.102	6.102	11.69	I4̅2d	5.81	1053	0.96; 0.52
AgInTe_{2}	6.42	6.42	12.59	I4̅2d	6.12	965	1.03
AgFeS_{2}	5.66	5.66	10.30	I4̅2d	4.53		0.88

- m stands for metastable, d for direct and i for indirect bandgap

== See also ==
- List of semiconductor materials
