= Umesh Mishra =

Professor at the University of California, Santa Barbara

Umesh K. Mishra
- Born: 1958 (age 67–68)
- Education: Indian Institute of Technology Kanpur; Lehigh University; Cornell University
- Known for: High speed, RF GaN based HEMTs
- Scientific career
- Fields: Electrical Engineering; Materials Science
- Workplaces: General Electric; University of California, Santa Barbara
- Doctoral advisor: Lester Eastman
- Doctoral students: Srabanti Chowdhury; Huili Grace Xing; Tomás Palacios (engineer)

Umesh K. Mishra is a professor in the Electrical & Computer Engineering Department at the University of California, Santa Barbara (1990–present). In 2023, he was appointed dean of the UC Santa Barbara College of Engineering. He is the CTO, co-founder and board member of Transphorm, founded in 2007 and the first company to deliver gallium nitride (GaN) transistor products for high efficiency power conversion technologies. Prior to Transphorm, he co-founded Nitres Inc. in 1996, which was the first company to develop GaN LEDs and transistors.

== Career ==
Mishra earned a B.Tech. degree from the Indian Institute of Technology Kanpur, India in 1979. He went on earn his M.S. in electrical engineering at Lehigh University in 1981 and Ph.D. at Cornell University in 1984 and served as a principal staff engineer at General Electric. Mishra was elected to the National Academy of Engineering in 2009 for his contributions to the development of gallium nitride electronics and other high-speed, high-power semiconductor electronic devices. Mishra’s company Transphorm was selected by the World Economic Forum as a 2013 Technology Pioneer for its innovations in GaN technology, the solutions from which can cut total world electrical energy waste by up to 10 percent.

Mishra has over 1,000 publications and is a fellow of IEEE, member of the National Academy of Engineering, and a recipient of both the IEEE David Sarnoff Award and the ISCS Quantum Device Award. Mishra ranks among the top 1% on the most highly cited researchers in the world and has an h-index of 100. He was elected to the National Academy of Inventors in 2015.

== Awards and honors ==
- Donald W. Whittier Chair in Electrical Engineering, UCSB 2013
- Heinrich Welker Award for "The Development of GaN High Power Electronics from Conception, Education to Commercialization," International Symposium on Compound Semiconductors, 2012
- Quantum Device Award, ISCS 2007
- IEEE David Sarnoff Award, 2007
- Distinguished Alumnus Award, IIT Kanpur, 2006
- Young Scientist of the Year Award, International GaAs Symposium 1992
- NSF, Presidential Young Investigator Award, 1989
