= Lester Fuess Eastman =

American physicist, engineer and educator

Lester Fuess Eastman (May 21, 1928 – August 9, 2013) was an American physicist, engineer and educator.

Eastman worked primarily with the development of high frequency semiconductor device engineering and science technologies from the early 1960s through to his retirement.

== Early years ==
Lester (Les) F. Eastman was born in Utica New York on May 21, 1928 to Mayme Lois Fuess Eastman and Howard Socrates Eastman, Jr. The middle, and only son in a family with four girls (Beverly, Jean, Dorothy and Gratia Eastman), his family's circumstances during the Depression were poor, but both his parents were educated and placed a high value on all their children achieving academic excellence and serving their community. Lester was a gifted student, as demonstrated by his earning the highest score on the New York State Physics Exam the year he graduated from Waterville, NY Central School in 1946. He graduated at the top of his class.

== Early Career and Education ==
During WWII while still in high school, Eastman attempted to enlist in U.S. Navy, but was turned away because he was too young. He was accepted for admittance to Cornell University in 1946, but chose instead to first join the U.S. Navy. There he was introduced to engineering, serving as a radar specialist upon the USS Coral Sea. This was the aircraft carrier's commissioning voyage, and he spent much of his time in the Caribbean and Guantanamo Bay, Cuba.

In 1948, after two years in the U.S. Navy he entered Cornell University on the GI Bill. He obtained a Bachelor of Science degree in Electrical Engineering in 1953, a Master of Science as a Sperry Gyroscope fellow in 1955, and the Doctor of Philosophy as a General Electric Fellow in 1957, all from the School of Electrical Engineering (now Electrical and Computer Engineering) at Cornell University. Following his doctoral thesis, “An Analysis of the Effect of Radial Electron Motions in Linear Beam Tubes,” he became a principal investigator in linear beam microwave tube research under contract with the U.S. Air Force.

During his undergraduate education, he met and married Anne Marie Gardner of Chittenango, NY. All three of his children, David Joel, Daniel Gardner, and Laurie Suzanne Eastman, were born by the time he obtained his Bachelor of Science degree.

== Career Development ==
Eastman joined the faculty at Cornell University in electrical engineering (now electrical and computer engineering) as an instructor from 1954 to 1956, an assistant professor from 1957 to 1959, and an associate professor in 1959. He became a full professor in 1966. He retired from Cornell's School of Electrical and Computer Engineering in 2011.

In 1960–61, Prof. Eastman was recruited to take part in a one-year teaching exchange with associate professor of Electronics Sven Olving at the School of Engineering at Chalmers Institute of Technology in Gothenburg, Sweden. The exchange was arranged by Prof. Olof E. H. Rydbeck, Victor Emanuel Distinguished Professor. He later credited this exchange experience with broadening his focus on his engineering career and his view of the world.

== Honors and awards ==
He was elected to the National Academy of Engineering in 1986 for his "...pioneering and continuing contributions to communications technology resulting from the development of high-speed and high-frequency gallium arsenide devices."

Whilst at Cornell University, he was awarded in 2001 the status of Fellow of the American Physical Society after being nominated by their Forum on Industrial and Applied Physics for pioneering contributions to the concepts of ballistic transport and piezoelectric doping in ultra-small III-V heterojunction transistors for applications in high-speed and microwave power devices and circuits and for leadership in transitioning electric.

The IEEE EDS Lester F. Eastman Award was established in 2019 with the intention to commemorate the life activities of Lester F. Eastman whose distinguished contributions, particularly in the physics and technology of compound semiconductor materials and devices; invented, fabricated, and investigated many novel semiconductor materials and devices. His work on so many occasions resulted in breakthroughs enabling important practical applications.

== Notable students ==
The following is an incomplete list of his notable graduate students:

- Theda M. Daniels-Race – Distinguished Professor in the Division of Electrical and Computer Engineering at Louisiana State University
- Donald Kerr – Principal Deputy Director of National Intelligence, Director of Los Alamos National Laboratory
- Umesh K. Mishra – Donald W. Whittier Chair in Electrical Engineering, UCSB
- David Welch – Cofounder of Infinera Corporation
- Jerry Woodall – Professor, UC Davis; National Academy of Engineering, member

== See also ==
- List of fellows of the American Physical Society (1998–2010)
