= Transphorm =

American semiconductor company

Transphorm, Inc.
- Company type: Subsidiary
- Traded as: Nasdaq: TGAN
- Industry: Power electronics
- Founded: 2007; 19 years ago
- Founders: Umesh Mishra; Primit Parikh
- Headquarters: Goleta, California, U.S.
- Products: GaN power transistors
- Parent: Renesas Electronics
- Website: transphormusa.com

Transphorm, Inc. is an American semiconductor company focused on producing transistors made from gallium nitride (GaN) for use in switched-mode power supplies. The company was acquired by Renesas Electronics in 2024.

== History ==
Transphorm was founded in February 2007 in Delaware. It is headquartered in Goleta, California, close to the University of California at Santa Barbara (UCSB) from which the company is an offshoot and where the co-founder and CTO, Umesh Mishra, is a professor.

In 2011, Google Ventures invested $20 million into Transphorm. The money was to assist the company's development of power conversion technologies. It also received capital from Kleiner Perkins and others amounting to $18 million.

In September 2012, Transphorm released the TPH2006PS which was the first JEDEC qualified 600V HEMT in the industry.

In November 2013, Transphorm teamed up with Fujitsu Semiconductor to integrate its GaN power devices into power supply businesses with Fujitsu as well as Fujitsu Semiconductor only taking minority equity positions.

In 2015, it received a $70 million investment which was led by the global investment firm KKR.

Transphorm went public by reversing merging with a special-purpose acquisition company, Peninsula Acquisition Corporation, in February 2020. In August 2021, Transphorm acquired 100% interest in the AFSW wafer-fab facility from GaNovation, a manufacturer for high voltage GaNs.

In March 2023, Transphorm released the first gallium nitride (GaN) System-in-Package (SiP) together with Weltrend Semiconductor Inc.. The Weltrend SiP will be showcased by Transphorm at the 2023 Applied Power Electronics Conference (APEC).

Together with Yaskawa Electric, Transphorm has developed a new patented technology for GaN power transistors with a short circuit withstand time (SCWT) of 5 microseconds in August 2023.

In January 2024, Renesas Electronics agreed to acquire Transphorm for $339 million. On June 20, 2024, it was announced that Renesas had completed the purchase of the company.
