= Tomás Palacios (engineer) =

Spanish-American engineer (born 1978)

- Born: 1978 (age 47–48); Jaén, Spain
- Education: UC Santa Barbara (PhD, MS); Technical University of Madrid (BS)
- Spouse: Natalia Palacios
- Scientific career
- Fields: Electronics, compound semiconductors, 2D materials
- Workplaces: Massachusetts Institute of Technology
- Thesis: Optimization of the high frequency performance of nitride-based transistors (2006)
- Doctoral advisor: Umesh Mishra
- Website: www.tpalacios.mit.edu

Tomás A. Palacios Gutiérrez (born 1978) is a Spanish–American Electrical & Microelectronics Engineer known for his work in advanced device and material design. He holds the chair Clarence J. LeBel Professor of Electrical Engineering and Computer Science at the Massachusetts Institute of Technology and director of Microsystems Technology Laboratories (MTL). Palacios is known for inventing a super-thin 'sheet' that can charge mobile phones without electricity.

== Early life and education ==
Palacios was born in 1978 in Jaén, Spain. He completed a Bachelor of Science in Telecommunications and Electrical Engineering from the Polytechnic University of Madrid in 2001, followed by a Master of Science in Electrical Engineering from University of California, Santa Barbara in 2004. He then did a doctoral degree there which he defended in 2006, under supervisor Umesh Mishra, with his dissertation titled Optimization of the high frequency performance of nitride-based transistors.

Palacios completed a Bachelor of Science in Telecommunications and Electrical Engineering from the Polytechnic University of Madrid in 2001, followed by a Master of Science in Electrical Engineering from University of California, Santa Barbara in 2004. He then did a doctoral degree there which he defended in 2006, under supervisor Umesh Mishra, with his dissertation titled Optimization of the high frequency performance of nitride-based transistors.

== Career ==
After finishing his doctorate, Palacios joined the MIT Electrical Engineering and Computer Science Department as an associate professor in 2006. As a professor of Electrical Engineering at Massachusetts Institute of Technology (MIT) since 2006, Palacios has been instrumental in shaping the landscape of modern microelectronics.In the fields of semiconductor device physics, nanotechnology, and electronics, Palacios has led research initiatives that have significantly advanced the field.

Palacios holds directorships in various centers and programs, including being founding director of the MTL Center for Graphene Devices and 2D Systems and MTL Gallium Nitride (GaN) Energy Initiative (MIT-GaN) Associate Director of SUPeRior Energy-efficient Materials and dEvices (SUPREME) Center; coordinator of 6A Masters in Engineering (6A M.Eng.) program from 2015 to 2023; fellow of the Fundacion Gadea; IEEE Fellow; general chair and executive committee member for the 2022 IEEE Symposium on Very Large-Scale Integration Technology (VLSI) and Circuits.

== Research and Invention ==
In 2013, Tomás Palacios investigated the use of ‘extreme materials’ in electronics, which could reduce energy consumption and make computers much faster.

In 2019, Palacios invented a super-thin 'sheet' that could charge mobile phone. He created this super-thin, bendy material of molybdenum disulfide (MoS2) that absorb wireless internet and other electromagnetic waves in the air and turns them into electricity.

== Notable publications ==
- "2D materials for logic device scaling", 2024; Peng Wu, Tianyi Zhang, Jiadi Zhu, Tomás Palacios, Jing Kong
- "Adaptive tactile interaction transfer via digitally embroidered smart gloves", 2024; Yiyue Luo, Chao Liu, Young Joong Lee, Joseph DelPreto, Kui Wu, Michael Foshey, Daniela Rus, Tomás Palacios, Yunzhu Li, Antonio Torralba, Wojciech Matusik
- "Erratum: Electronics based on two-dimensional materials", 2014; Gianluca Fiori, Francesco Bonaccorso, Giuseppe Iannaccone, Tomás Palacios, Daniel Neumaier, Alan Seabaugh, Sanjay K. Banerjee & Luigi Colombo; Citations:24
- 'Integrated biosensor platform based on graphene transistor arrays for real-time high-accuracy ion sensing'; 2022, Maintain Xue, Charles Mackin, Wei-Hung Weng, Jiadi Zhu, Yiyue Luo, Shao-Xiong Lennon Luo, Ang-Yu Lu, Marek Hempel, Elaine McVay, Jing Kong & Tomás Palacios; Citations:29
- "Mildred Dresselhaus (1930–2017)", 2017; Jing Kong, Tomás Palacios, Leora Dresselhaus-Cooper, Shoshi Cooper

== Honors and awards ==
- Intel's Outstanding Researcher Award in 2020
- Presidential Early Career Award for Scientists and Engineers in 2012
- 2019 IEEE George Smith Award
