= Renesas Electronics =

Japanese semiconductor manufacturer

Renesas Electronics Corporation
- Native name: ルネサス エレクトロニクス株式会社
- Formerly: NEC Electronics Corporation
- Type: Public
- Traded as: TYO: 6723; Nikkei 225 component
- Industry: Semiconductor
- Predecessor: Renesas Technology
- Founded: November 1, 2002; 23 years ago (as NEC Electronics)
- Headquarters: Tokyo, Japan
- Key people: Hidetoshi Shibata (president and CEO)
- Revenue: ▼¥1.321 trillion (2025)
- Operating income: ▼¥201.2 billion (2025)
- Net income: ▼ −¥51.8 billion (2025)
- Total assets: ▼¥4.177 trillion (2025)
- Total equity: ▼¥2.449 trillion (2025)
- Number of employees: 21,629 (2025)
- Website: renesas.com

Renesas Electronics Corporation (Japanese: ルネサス エレクトロニクス株式会社, Hepburn: Runesasu Erekutoronikusu Kabushiki Gaisha) is a Japanese semiconductor manufacturer headquartered in Tokyo. It supplies embedded processors, analog, power and connectivity devices and related software for automotive, industrial, infrastructure and IoT applications. In 2025, Renesas ranked third worldwide in the microcontroller (MCU) market, behind Infineon Technologies and NXP Semiconductors. In the broader automotive semiconductor market, it ranked fifth in 2024 with a 7% share of global sales.

Renesas Electronics began operations in April 2010 following the merger of NEC Electronics and Renesas Technology. NEC Electronics, which had been established in November 2002, was the surviving legal entity and was renamed Renesas Electronics Corporation when the merger took effect. Renesas Technology had been formed in 2003 by combining the non-DRAM semiconductor operations of Hitachi and Mitsubishi Electric. After severe operational and financial difficulties in the early 2010s, Renesas underwent restructuring backed by the state-supported Innovation Network Corporation of Japan (INCJ), and later expanded through acquisitions including Intersil, Integrated Device Technology (IDT), Dialog Semiconductor and Altium.

In 2025, Renesas discontinued development of its own silicon carbide (SiC) power semiconductors and identified gallium nitride (GaN) as an area for concentrated investment. Its 2025 results included a ¥236.6 billion loss related to its financial exposure to Wolfspeed, contributing to a loss attributable to owners of the parent of ¥51.8 billion. In 2026, the company completed the transfer of its timing business to SiTime.

== History ==
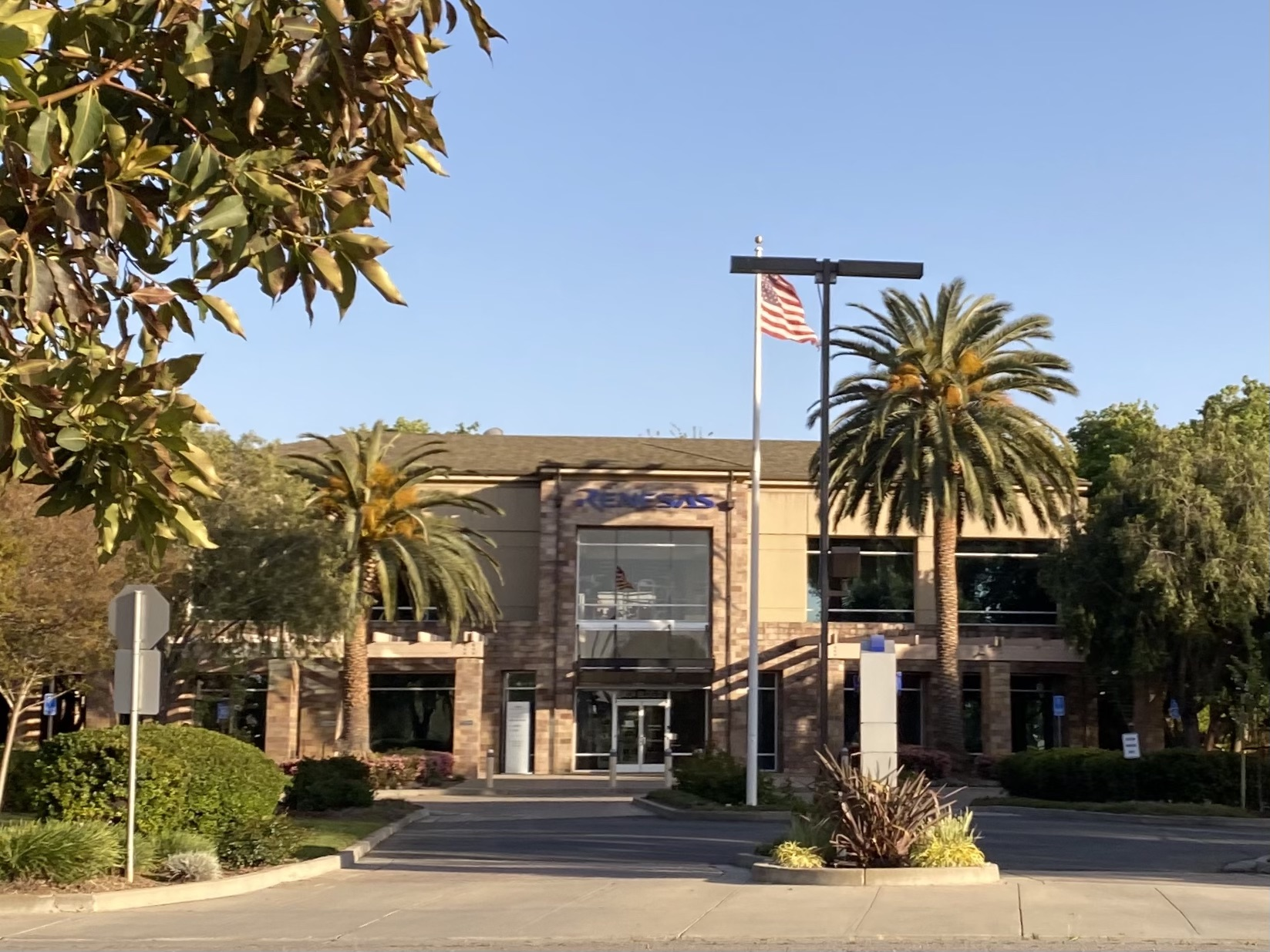
Renesas Silicon Valley offices in San Jose, California

NEC spun off its semiconductor operations as NEC Electronics on November 1, 2002. NEC Electronics was subsequently listed on the Tokyo Stock Exchange in 2003.

Renesas Technology was formed in April 2003 by Hitachi and Mitsubishi Electric, combining their non-DRAM semiconductor businesses. The company was owned 55% by Hitachi and 45% by Mitsubishi Electric. The name "Renesas" was derived from "Renaissance Semiconductor for Advanced Solutions". The companies had previously separated their DRAM operations into Elpida Memory, which filed for bankruptcy in 2012 and was subsequently acquired by Micron Technology.

In September 2009, NEC Electronics and Renesas Technology agreed to merge. The transaction took effect on April 1, 2010 as an absorption-type merger in which NEC Electronics was the surviving company and Renesas Technology ceased to exist as a separate corporation. NEC Electronics changed its name to Renesas Electronics Corporation and began operations under that name on the same day.

In December 2010, Renesas Mobile Corporation was formed by integrating Renesas's mobile business with wireless-modem assets acquired from Nokia. Renesas later exited the mobile sector, transferring LTE assets to Broadcom in 2013 and absorbing Renesas Mobile in 2014.

The 2011 Tōhoku earthquake and tsunami and flooding in Thailand severely affected Renesas's operations and semiconductor supply chains. A major restructuring followed, involving workforce reductions, the sale and consolidation of domestic production facilities, and a government-led capital injection. Following a third-party share allotment in September 2013, the state-backed Innovation Network Corporation of Japan held 69.15% of Renesas's shares.

For the year ended March 2014, Renesas recorded operating income of ¥67.6 billion, compared with an operating loss of ¥23.2 billion in the previous year. Its net loss narrowed from ¥167.6 billion to ¥5.3 billion.

From 2016 onward, Renesas carried out a series of acquisitions that broadened its business beyond its traditional MCU base. It acquired U.S. analog semiconductor company Intersil in 2017. In 2019, it acquired Integrated Device Technology (IDT) in a transaction valued at approximately $6.7 billion.

Hidetoshi Shibata, who had served as chief financial officer, became president and CEO on July 1, 2019.

In March 2021, a fire at the Naka Factory temporarily disrupted production during a period of global automotive semiconductor shortages. Production resumed in stages from April.

In 2021, Renesas purchased Dialog Semiconductor for approximately $6 billion, followed by acquisitions including Celeno Communications, Reality AI, and Steradian Semiconductors.

In December 2022, Renesas received the Outstanding Asia-Pacific Semiconductor Company Award from the Global Semiconductor Alliance. In April 2023, the company was added to the Nikkei 225 index.

INCJ, which had begun reducing its stake in 2017, sold its remaining Renesas shares in November 2023. Its ownership ratio thereby fell from 69.15% following the 2013 investment to 0%.

Renesas continued its expansion in 2023 and 2024. It acquired Panthronics, gallium nitride semiconductor maker Transphorm, and electronic-design software company Altium for approximately $5.9 billion.

In January 2025, Renesas announced plans to reduce its global workforce by less than 5%, or fewer than 1,000 positions, amid weak semiconductor demand. It also postponed regular salary increases scheduled for that spring.

Renesas had entered into a ten-year silicon carbide (SiC) wafer supply agreement with Wolfspeed in 2023 and provided a $2 billion deposit. In 2025, Renesas discontinued development of its own SiC power semiconductors and identified GaN as one of the technologies in which it would concentrate investment. Wolfspeed entered Chapter 11 proceedings in June 2025 under a restructuring agreement involving Renesas and other creditors. Renesas ultimately recorded a ¥236.6 billion loss in its 2025 accounts related to the conversion of its Wolfspeed deposit into other financial assets.

In February 2026, Renesas agreed to transfer its timing business, which had originated with the 2019 acquisition of IDT, to U.S. timing-device manufacturer SiTime. Renesas valued the transaction at approximately $3.0 billion, consisting of $1.5 billion in cash and approximately 4.13 million SiTime shares, with the stock consideration subject to a price collar. The transfer was completed on July 1, 2026. Renesas expected to record a gain of approximately ¥443.3 billion from the transfer in its financial statements for the nine months ending September 2026. Renesas and SiTime also agreed to explore integrating SiTime's MEMS resonators with Renesas MCUs and SoCs.

== Products ==
=== Microcontrollers ===
==== RL78 family ====
RL78 is the family name for a range of 16-bit microcontrollers. These were the first new MCUs introduced by Renesas Electronics after the 2010 integration of NEC Electronics and Renesas Technology. The RL78 combined the NEC-originated 78K0R CPU core with peripheral technologies from the 78K and Renesas R8C families.

The RL78 core variants include the S1, S2, and S3 type cores. The basic S1 core supports 74 instructions, the S2 core adds register banking and supports 75 instructions, while the S3 core adds an on-chip multiplier/divider and multiply–accumulate capability and supports 81 instructions.

The RL78 was developed for low-power, highly integrated microcontroller applications. Its operating modes include "snooze mode", in which peripherals such as the ADC or serial interface can operate while the CPU remains stopped and wake the processor when specified conditions are met.

==== RX family ====
The RX, an acronym for Renesas Xtreme, is the family name for a range of 32-bit microcontrollers developed by Renesas Technology and subsequently Renesas Electronics.

The RX family was launched in 2009 by Renesas Technology, with the first product range designated the RX600 series. It targeted applications including metering, motor control, human–machine interfaces (HMI), networking and industrial automation. The family was later expanded with the lower-power RX200 series and additional higher-performance products.

==== RA family ====
The RA, an acronym for Renesas Advanced, is the family name for a range of 32-bit microcontrollers using Arm Cortex-M processor cores. The family is designed around embedded security, performance and low-power operation, and is supported by Renesas's Flexible Software Package.

MCU Family Specifications
Family	CPU	Operating Frequency (MHz)	Program Memory (KB)	Data Flash (KB)	RAM (KB)	Lead Count	Supply Voltage (V)
RA	ARM CM23; ARM CM33; ARM CM4	48, 100, 120, 200	32, 64, 128, 256, 384, 512, 768, 1024, 2048	4, 8, 32, 63	16, 32, 64, 96, 128, 256, 384, 640	25, 32, 36, 40, 48, 56, 64, 80, 100, 144, 145, 176	1.6–5.5; 1.8–3.6; 2.7–3.6; 2.7–3.7

==== RH850 family ====
The RH850 is a family of 32-bit automotive microcontrollers used for real-time vehicle-control applications, including powertrain, chassis and body systems. It succeeded the NEC-originated V850 family, for which Renesas provides migration paths to RH850 devices.

RH850 devices are designed for automotive applications in which functional safety, reliability and security are significant requirements. Later devices have incorporated multiple processor cores and functions for motor control, automotive communications, security and functional safety, allowing functions previously distributed across multiple electronic control units to be consolidated.

RH850 MCUs are also used alongside Renesas's R-Car automotive SoCs in vehicle systems.

=== Automotive systems on a chip ===
==== R-Car family ====
R-Car is Renesas's family of automotive systems on a chip (SoCs), used in applications including advanced driver-assistance systems (ADAS), automated driving, in-vehicle infotainment, digital cockpits and vehicle gateways.

Successive generations of R-Car have been developed for increasing levels of automotive computing. In 2024, Renesas introduced the R-Car X5H as the first device in its fifth-generation R-Car family. The X5H uses a 3 nm process and is designed to combine processing for multiple automotive domains, including ADAS, in-vehicle infotainment and gateway functions.

The fifth-generation platform moves Renesas's automotive MCU and SoC development toward a common Arm-based architecture and software toolchain across a broader range of vehicle-control and high-performance computing devices.

=== Microprocessors ===
==== RZ family ====
The Renesas RZ family is a family of high-end 32- and 64-bit microprocessors designed for applications including high-resolution human–machine interfaces (HMI), embedded vision, real-time control and industrial Ethernet connectivity.

The family includes RZ/A and RZ/G products for HMI applications, RZ/T for high-speed real-time control, and RZ/N for networking.

MPU Family Specifications
Family	Bit Size	RAM (KB)	CPU	Lead Count (#)	Supply Voltage (V)	Max Operating Frequency (MHz)
RZ	32, 64	128–10240	Cortex-A15; Cortex-A15+Cortex-A7; Cortex-A53; Cortex-A55+Cortex-M33; Cortex-A57; Cortex-A57+Cortex-A53; Cortex-A7; Cortex-A9; Cortex-M3; Cortex-R4F; Cortex-R52	112, 176, 196, 208, 233, 256, 272, 320, 324, 361, 400, 456, 501, 551, 552, 831, 841, 1022	3–3.6	125–1500

=== Legacy architectures ===
The 2010 merger brought together a large number of previously separate microcontroller architectures. Major product lines included NEC Electronics's 78K and V850 families and Renesas Technology's R8C, M16C, H8, RX and SuperH families. Renesas initially continued development and support across the principal architectures while integrating its development and manufacturing structures.

Later product families incorporated technology from, or provided migration paths for, several of these architectures. RL78 combined technology from the 78K and R8C families, while migration tools were provided from R8C/M16C and H8 devices to newer RL78 and RX products and from V850 devices to RH850.

=== Other semiconductor products and software ===
In addition to embedded processors, Renesas supplies analog and mixed-signal devices, power-management products, power semiconductors and connectivity devices. Its product portfolio was broadened through acquisitions including Intersil, IDT, Dialog Semiconductor and Transphorm.

The acquisition of Transphorm added gallium nitride power-semiconductor technology to the company's portfolio. Renesas subsequently identified GaN as an area for concentrated investment after discontinuing development of its own SiC power semiconductors.

The acquisition of IDT expanded Renesas's analog and mixed-signal portfolio, including timing products. The IDT-originated timing business was transferred to SiTime in 2026.

Renesas's 2024 acquisition of Altium expanded the company into electronic-design software. Altium technology became the basis for the Renesas 365 digital development platform, which entered general availability in March 2026.

== Corporate affairs ==
=== Shareholding and capital transactions ===
As of June 30, 2026, the largest shareholders of Renesas included the following:

Shareholder	Shareholding
Master Trust Bank of Japan (trust account)	15.65%
Custody Bank of Japan (trust account)	6.10%
Toyota Motor Corporation	4.10%
State Street Bank and Trust Company 505001	3.40%

The percentages exclude treasury stock.

In May 2012, NEC transferred part of its stake in Renesas to its employee pension trust. As a result, the NEC pension fund held 32.4% of Renesas while NEC itself held 3.0%.

In September 2013, Renesas issued new shares through a third-party allotment, after which INCJ held 69.15% of the company's shares. INCJ began selling down its holdings in stages in 2017 and completed the sale of its remaining shares in November 2023, reducing its ownership to 0%.

In June 2022, Renesas completed an approximately ¥200 billion repurchase of its own shares.

=== Sustainability ===
Renesas has a target, validated by the Science Based Targets initiative (SBTi), to reduce Scope 1 and Scope 2 greenhouse-gas emissions by 38% by 2030 compared with 2021 levels.

In its Sustainability Strategy 2.0, formulated in 2025, the company moved its target year for achieving carbon neutrality from 2050 to 2040. Renesas reported that its Scope 1 and Scope 2 greenhouse-gas emissions in 2025 were 24.2% below the 2021 base-year level.

== Manufacturing sites ==
Renesas follows a fab-light manufacturing strategy, combining its own semiconductor fabrication and assembly facilities with external foundries and outsourced semiconductor assembly and test providers. In the first half of 2022, approximately 43% of both front-end and back-end production was conducted in-house, and the company stated that it intended to increase the proportion outsourced. Advanced process nodes were assigned primarily to external foundries, while mature processes used a combination of internal production and foundries. The use of external foundries has continued for leading-edge devices; the R-Car X5H, for example, uses TSMC's automotive 3 nm process.

Renesas conducts front-end semiconductor production in Japan primarily through its wholly owned subsidiary Renesas Semiconductor Manufacturing. As of 2026, the subsidiary operated five front-end factories:

- Naka Factory, Ibaraki Prefecture
- Takasaki Factory, Gunma Prefecture
- Saijo Factory, Ehime Prefecture
- Kawashiri Factory, Kumamoto Prefecture
- Kofu Factory, Yamanashi Prefecture

Outside Japan, Renesas Electronics America operates a semiconductor wafer-fabrication facility in Palm Bay, Florida. Renesas also operates manufacturing facilities through subsidiaries in China and Malaysia, as well as design, engineering and sales operations in other countries. Domestic back-end production sites include Yonezawa, Oita and Nishiki.

=== Kofu Factory ===
Renesas announced in 2022 that it would restart the Kofu Factory as a 300 mm wafer fab for power semiconductors, investing approximately ¥90 billion in the facility. The factory, which had ceased operations in 2014, restarted operations in April 2024. At that time, Renesas expected mass production of IGBTs and other products to begin in 2025.

Volume production on the 300 mm line was subsequently postponed. In April 2026, Renesas said that it expected mass production at the facility around 2028. During the first quarter of 2026, Renesas also allocated roughly half of ¥76 billion in capacity-expansion investment to Kofu as part of an effort to increase in-house production of digital products for AI data-center applications.

=== Takasaki Factory ===
In July 2026, Renesas announced that it would gradually end production at the Takasaki Factory and close the manufacturing facility after building sufficient inventory to meet customer demand. Production was expected to cease within two to three years. The company cited aging equipment and utility facilities and increasing difficulties in maintaining production on its six-inch wafer line.

Renesas said that research and development functions at the site would be retained and strengthened, with a focus on analog ICs and discrete power semiconductors for data-center and automotive applications.
