= PCB-Investigator =

ECAD software

- Other names: PCBI, PCBI-365
- Developer(s): EasyLogix
- Initial release: 2008; 17 years ago
- Stable release: 15.1
- Written in: C#, HTML, JavaScript
- Operating system: Windows
- Type: ECAD
- Website: www.pcb-investigator.com/en/

PCB-Investigator is a software tool used for the analysis, visualization, and optimization of printed circuit boards (PCBs). It is used for tasks such as PCB design validation and quality assurance. Developed by EasyLogix PCB-Investigator is owned by Schindler & Schill GmbH, a German company specializing in electronic design automation (EDA) software.

== History ==
The software was introduced in 2008 to meet the increasing demand for tools that support PCB analysis and visualization. Since its release, PCB-Investigator has been updated regularly to include new features and support for various PCB file formats. The currently available version is 15.1.

== Features ==
PCB-Investigator provides features for PCB design and manufacturing, supporting various file formats like ODB++, Gerber, and IPC-2581. It includes tools for design rule checks (DRC) and other analyses to verify compliance with industry standards. The software also offers 3D visualization of PCBs and supports scripting for task automation and workflow customization. In 2017, PCB-Investigator introduced browser-based support for PCB design reviews.

== See also ==
- Comparison of EDA software
- Altium Designer
- KiCad
- Cadence Allegro
