= Schematic editor =

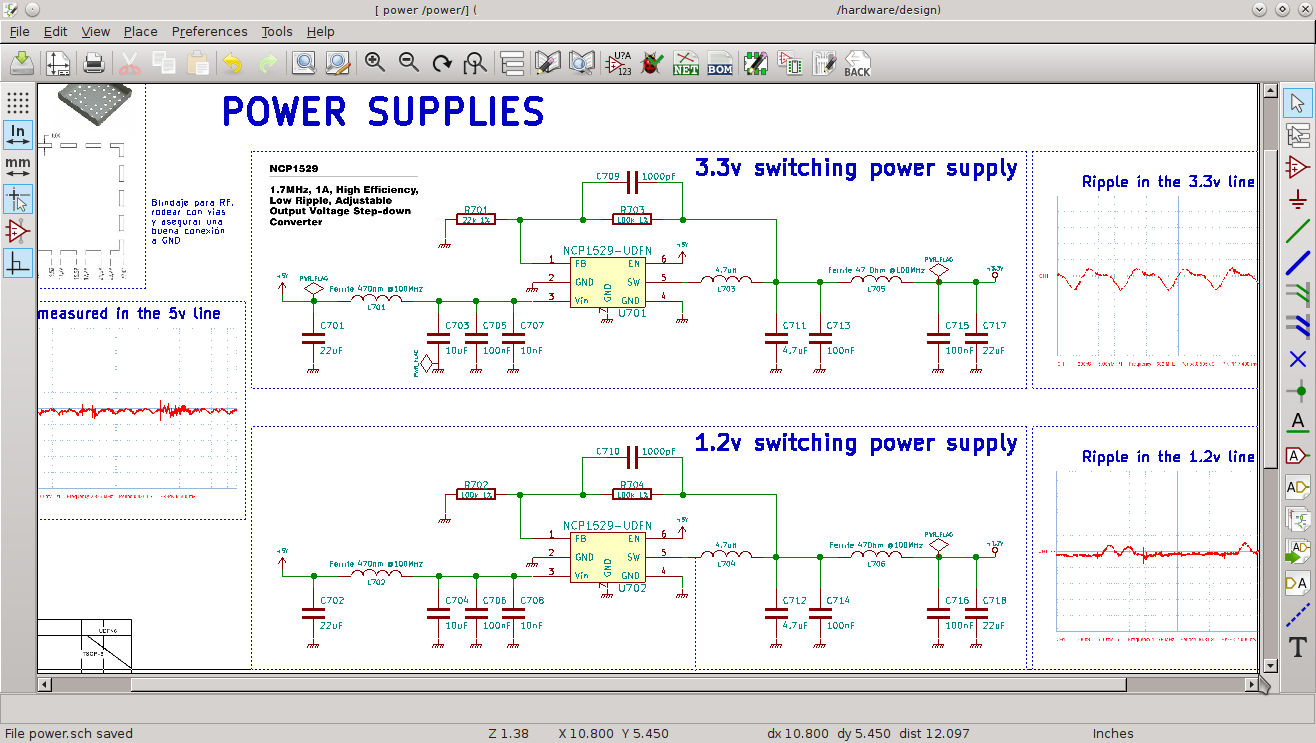
A screenshot of KiCad schematic software

A schematic editor is a tool for schematic capture of electrical circuits or electronic circuits.

Schematic editors replaced manual drawing of schematic diagrams, but they still retain the capability of outputting schematics on specially formatted sheets. At the same time modern schematic editors capture schematic data in a way suited for automatic processing by further stages of the design cycle.

Besides basic drawing and visualization capabilities, modern schematic editors typically provide the following capabilities:

- Capture electrical properties and other attributes of components, wires, nets and pins.
- Hierarchical way of design.
- Generate netlists and other common representations of the designed circuit from schematic.
- Generate documentation.
- Generate Gerber files to CAM.
- Libraries of standard components.
- Automatically detect and report errors in the schematic.
- Input designs from various formats, such as VHDL, Verilog, EDIF.

Schematic editors are also used for prototyping and circuit testing before a physical model is produced.

== See also ==
- Comparison of EDA software
- Comparison of computer-aided design editors
