= PCB drill file =

PCB drill file may refer:

- PCB NC formats, a collection of widely used drill file formats in PCB production
- Gerber file format, the de facto standard of data transfer from design to fabrication, and which can transfer drill information
