= Joseph Gerber =

American inventor and businessman

- Born: 17 April 1924; Vienna, Austria
- Died: 8 August 1996 (aged 72); Hartford, Connecticut, US
- Education: Rensselaer Polytechnic Institute
- Occupation: Manufacturing automation systems
- Spouse: Sonia Kanciper Gerber (1929–2003) (m. 1954–1996)
- Awards: National Medal of Technology (1994)

Heinz Joseph Gerber (17 April 1924 – 8 August 1996) was an American inventor and businessman. An Austrian-born Jewish Holocaust survivor who immigrated in 1940, he pioneered computer-automated manufacturing systems for an array of industries. Described as the "Thomas Edison of manufacturing", he was one of the first to recognize and develop the productivity-enhancing potential for computer automation in skill-intensive industrial sectors.

His work in this field grew from his early developments of graphical-numerical computing devices, data-reduction tools, and plotters.

He was awarded America's National Medal of Technology, the country's highest recognition in technology and innovation, in 1994, for his "technical leadership in the invention, development and commercialization of manufacturing automation systems for a wide variety of industries." These industries ranged from automotive, aerospace, shipbuilding, clothing, and consumer electronics, to printing, sign making, cobbling, cartography, and lens crafting, amongst others.

== Early life ==
Gerber was born into a Jewish family in Vienna, Austria, and showed an early fascination with technology. By age eight, he had built radios and developed magnetic circuit breakers to preserve his batteries. Following Germany's 1938 Anschluss, he was imprisoned in a Nazi labor camp, eventually to be released. In 1940, he fled with his mother, immigrating as a destitute to New York City and soon thereafter Hartford, Conn. to work in the tobacco fields. His father would not survive the Holocaust in Europe.

In Hartford, Gerber completed high school in just two years while learning English and holding down full-time and part-time jobs. He entered Rensselaer Polytechnic Institute (RPI), Troy, New York on scholarship, and graduated two and one-half years later with a Bachelor of Science degree in aeronautical engineering. In his junior year, he invented the Gerber Variable Scale, a graphical-numerical computing device that he conceived from the elastic waistband of his pajamas.

Receiving a $3,000 investment, Gerber patented his Variable Scale and founded the Gerber Scientific Instrument Company in Hartford, Connecticut, to produce and market the device. Before the widespread use of digital computers, performing computations based on graphically recorded data and curves was extremely time-consuming and complex. The Gerber Variable Scale—which used a triangular calibrated spring as a computing element to eliminate all scaling and conversions between numerics and graphics—provided means for quick, efficient calculations, and became known as "the greatest engineering tool since the slide rule".

Gerber's early life and accomplishments in America were the subject of the 1950 Broadway play Young Man in a Hurry, written by Morton Wishengrad and starring Cornel Wilde. In 1953, J. Robert Oppenheimer and other judges selected Gerber as one of the U.S. Chamber of Commerce's "Ten Most Outstanding Young Men in America." Reflecting on his immigrant experience, Gerber observed that he

learned that in USA it was true you could accomplish things if you were willing to work because then people, recognizing not only your abilities but your earnestness, will give you of themselves beyond belief to help you.

== Engineering, data reduction, and plotting ==
Through the 1950s, as the Gerber Variable Scale became "the standard tool" that engineers worldwide used for myriad applications, such as stress-strain analysis and architectural design, Gerber invented additional computation devices. These devices include: the Gerber GraphAnalogue, which directly performs computations on graphical data based on almost any linear or nonlinear function; the Gerber Derivimeter, which gives the derivative of a curve; and the Gerber Equameter, which provides the equation of a curve based on mathematical series such as Fourier series and polynomial expansions rapidly and without requiring knowledge of mathematics except for addition.

Gerber also introduced a line of data reduction products for scanning and digitizing, including the Gerber Analogue Data Reduction System and the Gerber Digital Data Reduction System to read x,y coordinate positions and convert the information into machine-readable punched tape. Gerber also introduced the first digital plotter, initially used for precisely plotting enemy battleship positions on maps, the first digital motion-controlled machine to create graphics. NASA's Johnson Space Center later relied on Gerber's plotters for communications analysis and graphical data display for the first lunar landing, in 1969.

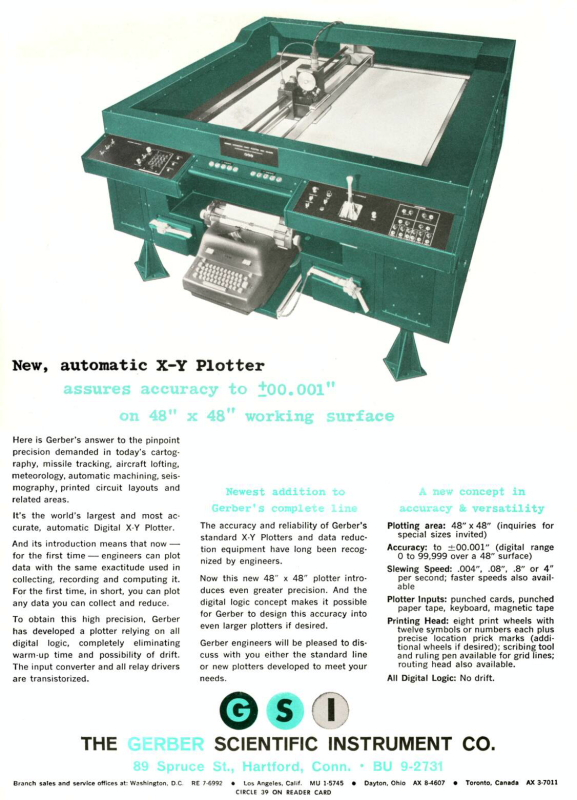
Gerber digital plotter enabled high precision drawing from digital data.

== Drafting, electronics, and CAD ==
During the 1960s and 1970s, Gerber pioneered developments in computer-assisted design and tooling manufacture both for complex mechanical products, such as airplanes, cars, and ships, and for the fabrication of circuit boards for consumer, industrial, and military electronics products.

Automated drafting and digitizing

In the early 1960s, Gerber introduced the first automated machines for drafting. By allowing engineers and designers to interact with the design process graphically, automated drafting represented a seminal application of computers to enhance creativity. Gerber's automated drafting technologies enabled the design of complex design products, such as the first "jumbo" military and commercial aircraft, the U.S. Air Force C-5 Transport by Lockheed Martin and the Boeing 747. This technology was credited with integrating the engineering design function with the numerically controlled machine tools in the aircraft, automotive, and shipbuilding industries, dramatically improving cost and manufacture time. Gerber's automated systems would capture three quarters of the automated drafting system market during the following two decades. Gerber also introduced the Automatic Line Follower, the first automated digitizer for vector graphics.

Electronics fabrication: photoplotting systems

Gerber also invented and introduced a novel form of plotter that used a controlled beam of light instead of an ink-pen, to draw digital graphics directly on photographic film. The world's most accurate printing technology, the "photoplotter" reduced the cost and time of fabricating circuit boards and enabled production of more sophisticated, miniaturized, and multi-layered printed circuit boards and integrated circuits. The photoplotter "revolutionized the production of printed circuit board artwork." Ultimately, the company would provide a suite of numerically controlled and computer-based tools for design through inspection of circuit boards. Gerber's computerized manufacturing process played a leading role in the consumer electronics revolution, from pocket radios to computers. The photoplotter was also used to manufacture over 75% of the CRT color television screens and the masters for the original Universal Product Code (UPC) barcodes.

Computer-aided design functionality and workstations

Gerber's early automated drafting and photoplotting systems evolved to include the seminal design functionality to digitize, interactively edit, and generate mechanical design data and electronic circuit-board artwork. With the growing power of digital computers during the late 1970s and 1980s, Gerber introduced the Interactive Design System IDS in 1974 and was a top tier supplier of software-and-hardware computer graphics workstations for Computer-Aided Design (CAD). Using Gerber workstations, Boeing designed the first "paperless aircraft," the Boeing 767, and General Motors reduced its time to bring new cars to market by more than half. Gerber introduced turnkey systems for electronics manufacture, including the PC-800 circuit design system in 1982. The industry's communications protocol remains the "Gerber Language." The Gerber companies also introduced CAD systems for the apparel, shoe, furniture, and sign and related display industries.

== Apparel, footwear, and textile manufacture ==
In the late 1960s, American apparel manufacturing was labor-intensive, completely without automation, and rapidly leaving the country for cheap foreign labor. Gerber developed a numerically controlled machine (the GERBERcutter S-70) for cutting large quantities of tall stacks of cloth accurately—3,500 pieces for 50 men's suits in less than three minutes. The GERBERcutter itself, which Gerber introduced in 1969, has been widely cited as the most important technological advance of the century, because it offered apparel factories significant savings in wasted cloth, which was the greatest cost factor in producing a garment, and because it enabled a computer-automated manufacturing system. Total sales of machines for cutting cloth based on Gerber's patented inventions are in the multiple billions of dollars.

VACUUM

COMPRESSION VIDEO

To automate cloth-cutting for apparel production, Gerber placed the stacked cloth on a bed of bristles that allowed a plunging knife to penetrate, compressed the stacked cloth using a vacuum, and sensed side forces on the knife and rotated the blade to balance the side forces and keep the blade from bending.

Within two years, Gerber introduced the first numerically controlled machines for sewing (the GSM-70) and producing pattern layouts, known as "markers" (the MP-26). Ultimately, his company would develop computer-controlled systems for the designing, digitizing, grading, and prototyping of apparel patterns, and an integrated system that included fabric spreaders, parts-moving systems, concept design, and product data management. As this system slowed the departure of the U.S. apparel manufacturing industry by more than a generation, leaders in the industry from manufacturing, labor, and other quarters hailed Gerber as its "father of apparel automation" and "the savior of the [American apparel] industry."

Gerber's automated cutting, layout, and sewing technologies were used as well in shoemaking to cut and embroider material for shoes. Gerber's impact included the development of the first 3D computer aided design workstations for making shoes. The Gerber ShoeMaker, introduced in 1989, reduced the time from twenty-eight days to two days to make shoes.

Based on Gerber apparel-making technologies, the company went on to develop a line of computer integrated manufacturing systems to automate the production of furniture. In addition, among the company's introductions in the textile industry was the first direct-to-screen screen-setter, the first system to make screens for screen-printing directly from digital design data.

In the 1980s, Gerber contemplated additive manufacturing strategies for making apparel, furniture, or shoes, including growing leather parts and spraying fabric-material onto molds.

== Printing, sign making, and outdoor graphics ==
Gerber's impact on the modern history of printing ranged from the technologies in plotting, photoplotting, computer graphics, and pattern-making to additional novel innovations in sign-making, engraving, billboard-printing, stripping, silkscreen mask-cutting, screen-setting, and plate-setting.

Gerber's photoplotter was the first computerized product used to automate printing prepress and was the first imagesetter. In 1981, Gerber introduced the Autoprep, the first computerized system specifically for production printing, and the beginning of automated prepress. This system managed the whole digital workflow of a printing operation and addressed all aspects of prepress production, from pre-flight, trapping, and imposition to RIPing and archiving. In 1984, Gerber began developing Computer-To-Plate (CTP) technology. Gerber's Crescent was the first commercially viable CTP Platesetter and was introduced in 1991. Observed Frank Romano, president of the Museum of Printing, "Gerber pioneered computer-to-plate; and, today almost all printers and newspapers use CTP."

The Gerber companies transformed the manufacture of signs from a craft to a computer-based industry. As recorded by the U.S. Department of Commerce in 1995:

The technologies first invented by Gerber for the drafting and electronics industries have now changed signmaking forever from a skill-driven craft to a mass production industry. No longer are letters and designs sketched, then painted or carved by hand. Under Gerber's guidance in the early 1980s, [the company] invented and developed Gerber Signmakers and related technologies, the most widely used computer controlled systems in the world for sign making and graphic arts. Workstations and software, plotters and routers take the sign making process automatically from the design and layout through production and cutting.

The company's innovations extended outdoor advertising by developing the first grand format digital printer in 1978. John W. Kluge, chairman of the Metromedia Company, which transformed billboard production, recalled: "His company created the process and equipment that my company, ?, Inc., uses to paint outdoor advertising graphics. The product is of such quality of color and fidelity to underlying artwork that a universal demand for our company to produce advertising displays throughout the world was created." The company developed digital thermal-transfer printers for outdoor signage. Among related industries, the company developed numerically controlled router technology as early as the 1950s, and the early computerized routing machines for trophy or nameplate engraving in the 1970s.

== Impact in additional industries ==
The impact of Gerber's technologies for drafting, electronics, and apparel production also reached the manufacturing processes in adjacent fields.

Prescription eyewear

The Gerber companies improved the manufacture of prescription eyewear by also applying computer integrated manufacturing to ophthalmic surface generation, edging, polishing, and coating. These automation products eliminated manual, skilled tasks for making prescription lenses in favor of an automation system that requires little training and resulted in higher quality lenses produced, at shopping mall stores as well as ophthalmic labs, in "about an hour" and at reduced cost.

Packaging and labeling

In the packaging and labeling industry, Gerber's prepress technologies impacted the printing and structural aspects, as printed packaging and labels relied largely on printing plates and screens. The Gerber EDGE digital printer enabled short run durable printing and cutting of labels. Additional products and technologies enabled cutting of specialty bags, and the production of coating blankets for spot UV coatings on cartons and for printing on aluminum beverage cans. For the structural aspects of packaging such as folding cartons and corrugated boxes, the industry's "sample maker" tables for prototyping and short run production, and "die vinyl plotters" used to print layout guides, and routers for making steel-rule die, are based in significant part on the technologies originally developed by Gerber in plotting, drafting, and other fields.

Other industries

Gerber's plotters and photoplotters applied computer-automation to cartography, which previously involved manual tasks and photographic processes. The company also developed machine tools and products for the medical, cryogenic, defense, and anti-terrorism sectors through its partially owned subsidiaries.

== Business career ==
Joe Gerber presided over Gerber Scientific's evolution from a one-product company to a global supplier of intelligent manufacturing systems. From the company's 1947 founding as a partnership, through his death in 1996, Gerber was its chief executive and principal inventor. Gerber called the company an outlet for the "spirit of invention," he told Business Week.

With the expansion of its product lines, Gerber restructured the company in 1979, creating the holding company Gerber Scientific, Inc., with wholly owned and partly owned subsidiaries, each focused on its own markets:

- Gerber Scientific, Inc. (NYSE GRB) (holding company)
- Gerber Scientific Instrument Co. (GSI) (data reduction, drafting especially aircraft and automotive, electronics)
- Gerber Garment Technology (GGT) (apparel, footwear, textile, and industrial such as aircraft and automotive)
- Gerber Systems Technology (GST) (CAD especially aircraft and automotive, footwear)
- Boston Digital (machine tools)
- Beta Electronics of Beersheba, Israel (medical, cryogenics, defense)
- Gerber Optical (ophthalmic lens processing)
- Gerber Scientific Products (GSP) (sign-making, specialty graphics such as vehicle wraps)
- Gerber Systems Corporation (GSC) (printing prepress)
- Gerber Innovations (packaging and die-making)

In 1980, Gerber Scientific, Inc. was listed on the New York Stock Exchange. In 1996, consolidated sales were $350 million. Considering the company's systems for made to measure clothing, and its flexible manufacturing technologies for producing signs, graphics, prescription lenses, and other individualized products, B. Joseph Pine II, the author of Mass Customization, observed in 2000 that Gerber Scientific, Inc. was the only company that had enabled mass customization in multiple industries.

== See also ==
- Gerber file format, also known as RS-274D, was named after Gerber and his company
