= X-ray CT scan =

X-ray CT scan can refer to the following Wikipedia articles:

- CT scan - makes use of computer-processed combinations of many X-ray images taken from different angles to produce cross-sectional (tomographic) images (virtual "slices") of specific areas of a scanned object, allowing the user to see inside the object without cutting.
- Industrial computed tomography - any computer-aided tomographic process, usually x-ray computed tomography, that (like its medical imaging counterparts) uses irradiation (usually with x-rays) to produce three-dimensional representations of the scanned object both externally and internally
- X-ray computed tomography measurement - a new technique with respect to measurements, which using industrial X-ray computed tomography system to obtain projection images, reconstruct 3D volumes, determine the surfaces, and extract the dimensions. Although using the similar industrial X-ray computed tomography system, it requires higher hardware quality and standard procedures. The system for this technique usually called metrological X-ray computed tomography system.
- Medical imaging - the technique and process of creating visual representations of the interior of a body for clinical analysis and medical intervention, as well as visual representation of the function of some organs or tissues
- X-ray computed tomography - makes use of computer-processed combinations of many X-ray images taken from different angles to produce cross-sectional (tomographic) images (virtual "slices") of specific areas of a scanned object, allowing the user to see inside the object without cutting.
