= Jesse Garant Metrology Center =

Coordinates: 42.3149°N 83.0030°W

- Formerly: Jesse Garant & Associates Inc.
- Company type: Private Corporation
- Industry: Testing Laboratories
- Founded: 2009
- Headquarters: 1219 Walker Road; Windsor, Ontario N8Y 2N9, Canada
- Area served: Worldwide
- Key people: Jesse Garant, President
- Services: NDT and Metrology
- Number of employees: <100 (2017)
- Website: jgarantmc.com

Jesse Garant Metrology Center is a part inspection company, providing NDT and metrology services using advanced imaging equipment.

== History ==
Jesse Garant & Associates Inc. was founded in 2009. In the fall of 2009, the company’s founder coined and popularized the term "Industrial CT Scanning" through a massive information marketing campaign.

In 2011 the company relocated its headquarters to the historical neighborhood of Walkerville. Through reinvestment the company added additional locations, employee skill-sets, service capacities, and diversified inspection capabilities to include digital radiography and 3D scanning. The company now builds and customizes its own industrial CT scanning systems for exclusive internal use for services.

In 2016 the company re-branded and changed its operating name to Jesse Garant Metrology Center.

In October 2017, Jesse Garant Metrology Center launched high energy CT scanning service to provide specialised inspection capabilities for advanced manufacturers.

== Services ==
The company offers Industrial CT Scanning, Industrial X-ray and 3D Scanning, operating out of 3 locations. It also is an authorized re-seller of Volume Graphics software in North America.
