= Hilary Kahn =

British computer scientist

- Born: 11 July 1943; Cape Town, South Africa
- Died: November 2007; Manchester, England
- Education: University of London; Newcastle University (PhD)
- Spouse: Brian Napper
- Children: one daughter
- Scientific career
- Fields: Computer-aided design
- Workplaces: University of Manchester

Hilary J. Kahn (1943–2007) was a South African British computer scientist who spent most of her career as a professor at the University of Manchester, where she worked on computer-aided design and information modelling. Kahn participated in the development of the Manchester MU5 computer. Later she became involved in standards development and was both the chair of the Technical Experts Group and a member of the Steering Committee for the development of the EDIF (Electronic Design Interchange Format) standard. Kahn retired from Manchester in 2006 and died in 2007.

== Early life and education ==
Kahn was born in 1943 in Cape Town, South Africa and moved in 1960 to England; she said later that she did so to pursue her education and escape the politics of her native country.

She attended the University of London and studied classics, after which she attended a post-graduate diploma course in computing at the Newcastle University, where she was first exposed to working with the English Electric KDF9 computer and programming in ALGOL. She subsequently worked as a programmer at English Electric.

== Career and research ==
Kahn joined the Computer Science Department at the University of Manchester in 1967, appointed as an assistant lecturer based on her ability to teach COBOL. She has been cited as an example of how women with non-traditional backgrounds could enter early academic computer science by offering unusual specialised skills.

Although Kahn never pursued a PhD, she was a faculty member who supervised a number of PhD students; during her tenure she started the computer-aided design (CAD) group at Manchester, worked on the Manchester MU5 computer, and was extensively involved in standards development, most notably for the EDIF project. She collaborated with Tom Kilburn and wrote published several obituaries on him.

Kahn was also active in preserving the history of early computing at Manchester and in 1998 organised a large-scale celebration Computer 50 for the 50th anniversary of the Manchester Baby, the first stored-program computer, which was completed in 1948.

Kahn retired from her faculty position in 2006.

== Personal life ==
Kahn's husband Brian Napper was also a Manchester faculty member. The couple had one child, a daughter, born in 1977. Kahn died in November 2007.
