= Schindler & Schill GmbH =

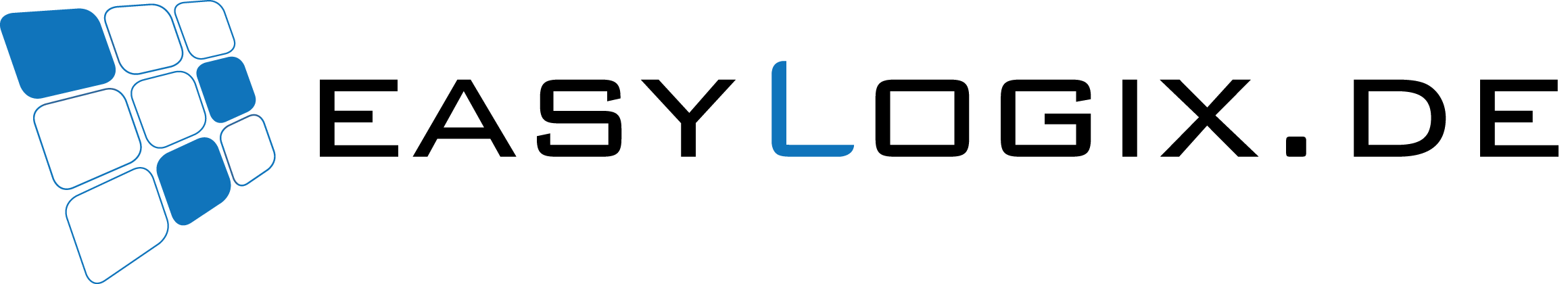
- Industry: EDA
- Founded: 2008
- Headquarters: Regensburg, Germany
- Products: PCB-Investigator, GerberLogix, Online Gerber Viewer
- Website: easylogix.de

Schindler&Schill GmbH is a German software company, founded 2008 in Regensburg by two experts on Windows based software. The company also trades under EasyLogix.

== Company Portrait ==
Since the foundation Günther Schindler has been holding the position as CEO. The first project was developing Windows drivers for USB devices, followed by GerberLogix, a free Gerber Viewer. Up to now the most extensive project is a complete CAD (computer-aided design) system for pcb (printed circuit board) analysis, the PCB-Investigator. Further areas EasyLogix is experienced in, are the development of semi-automatic and automatic tradingsystems, Add-ons for Windows Office products, software-engineering in OOP/OOD and data base applications. Furthermore, EasyLogix offers a university program and the possibility for clients to participate in the developing process. In 2011, EasyLogix joined the IPC-2581 Consortium, a group of pcb design and supply chain companies who want to establish IPC-2581 in the industry.

== Products ==
=== PCB-Investigator ===
PCB-Investigator is a CAD (computer-aided design) software for pcb (printed circuit board) development and manufacturing. The foundation for this project was the combination of hardware acceleration with software rendering. Using GDI, the PCB-Investigator is optimized for windows but has its own graphic data processing. After this basis, a software interface was added to the program, which allows creating own analysis algorithms or programming new import/export possibilities. The next step was implementing a full featured plug-in system. Like this, PCBI can create fitting customized packages and is suitable for various application areas, ranging from AOI (automated optical inspection) to boundary scan. A special function of PCB-Investigator is the possibility to put pictures behind the CAD data. Furthermore, PCBI offers an embedded function, which enables every department of the PCB development process license-free access to all needed data. Possible formats are ODB++, DXF, Catia, SolidWorks, X-File, BOM, Gerber, Excellon, Sieb & Meyer, GenCAD 1.4 and DXF. Upcoming format is IPC2581.

The tool is commercial software, but there is a free test version available. By now the tool has been used worldwide by electronic engineers and designers. PCB-Investigator is for free for universities.

=== GerberLogix ===
GerberLogix is a free, multifunctional Gerber Viewer. GerberLogix is an advancement to the Online Gerber Viewer by EasyLogix and offers Gerber274x and Excellon import with additional functions:

- Auto format recognition
- Different drawing modes
- High resolution image export
- Pictures can be imported and displayed behind the real CAD data
- Multiple selection possibilities
- Transparent drawing
- Different measure modes

System requirements are Microsoft Windows 7/Vista/XP/2003 and Microsoft .Net Framework 2.0. The software is free for non-commercial use, a license can be acquired.

=== Online Gerber Viewer ===
The Online Gerber Viewer is a free web service for the graphic presentation of Gerber274x and Excellon data, developed by EasyLogix, a German software company. An installation on the computer is not necessary, because the selected data are transmitted to the server, converted into images and online available for editing. The viewer can be integrated in a company network as well.

== See also ==
- Comparison of EDA software
