= Gerber Scientific =

American manufacturing technology conglomerate

- Company type: Private
- Founder: Joseph Gerber
- Headquarters: Tolland, Connecticut, U.S.
- Products: CAD software, graphics, composites
- Divisions: Gerber Technology; Gerber Scientific Products; Virtek Vision Int'l. Yunique Solutions
- Website: gerberscientific.com

Gerber Scientific Inc., is a manufacturing company headquartered in Tolland, Connecticut. It supplies software and hardware systems for apparel and technical textiles, sign-making and specialty graphics, composites, and packaging applications.

Gerber Scientific had been owned by Vector Capital, a San Francisco-based global private equity firm from 2011 to 2021. CITIC Capital Partners, a China-based private equity firm, had a minority stake.

In 2021, Gerber Technology and its affiliated companies were acquired by the French manufacturer Lectra.

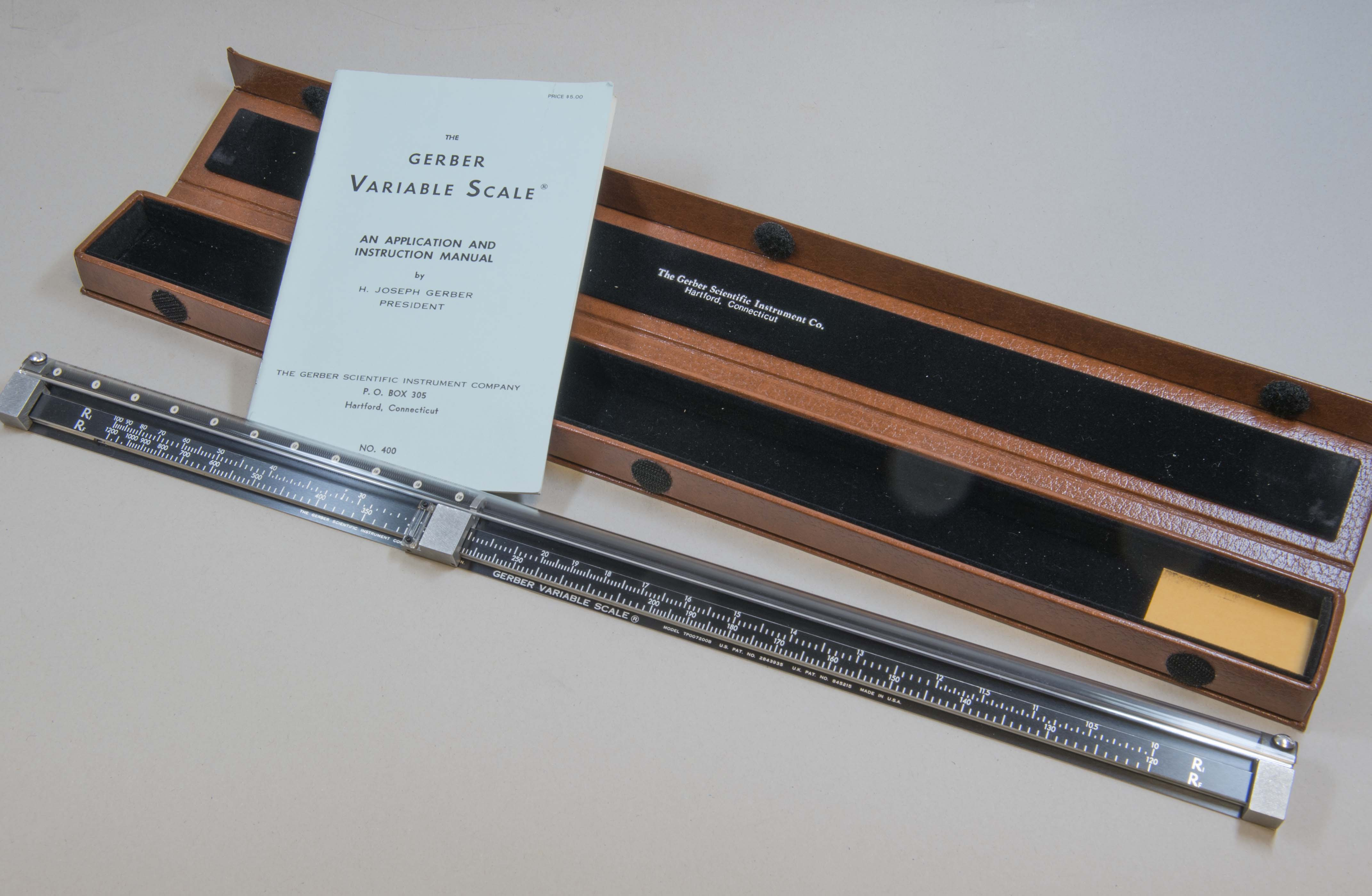
The variable scale invented by Joseph Gerber in 1948

== Divisions ==
Gerber Scientific, Inc. is divided into five businesses:

1. Gerber Technology provides hardware and software to manufacture with CAD software and computer-controlled cutting systems.
2. Gerber Innovations manufactures automated cutting hardware.
3. Virtek Vision International creates carbon fiber composite and sheet metal parts.
4. Gerber's Yunique Solutions makes product lifecycle management software.
5. Gerber Scientific Products manufactures computerized sign making and specialty graphics software, materials, and accessories for sign shops and graphics (for example, t-shirts with logos).
