= UV coating =

Surface coating hardened by UV light

A UV coating (or more generally a radiation cured coating) is a surface treatment which either is cured by ultraviolet radiation, or which protects the underlying material from such radiation's harmful effects. They have come to the fore because they are considered environmentally friendly and do not use solvents or produce volatile organic compounds (VOCs), or Hazardous Air Pollutant (HAPs), although some materials used for UV coating, such as PVDF in smart phones and tablets, are known to contain substances harmful to both humans and the environment.

== UV coatings on pipe and tube ==
UV coatings have been applied to mechanical tubing, safety/water suppression pipe and OCTG/line pipe for many years. UV coatings advantages in this application can be summarized as faster, smaller, and cleaner with no thermal ovens required. The coating and curing (almost instantly) at speeds ranging from 100 feet per minute to over 800 feet per minute so the faster production speeds provide greater opportunity for return on investment for the customer (ROI). The resulting smaller floor footprint for UV coatings line is 20–32 feet (6.1–9.8 m) in total length, while running 100–800 feet (30–244 m) feet per minute is also considered desirable. The process is cleaner because no Volatile organic compound|volatile organic compounds (VOCs), or Air pollution|Hazardous Air Pollutant (HAPs) are produced.

== Ultraviolet coatings in printing ==
Ultraviolet cured coatings can be applied over ink printed on paper and dried by exposure to UV radiation. UV coatings can be formulated up to 100% solids so that they have no volatile component that contributes to pollution. This high solids level also allows for the coating to be applied in very thin films. UV coatings can be formulated to a wide variety of gloss ranges. UV coating can be applied via most conventional industrial coating applications as well as by silkscreen and 3D printing.

Due to the normally high solids content of UV coating/varnish the surface of the cured film can be extremely reflective and glossy. 80 lb text and heavier weights of paper can be UV coated, however, cover weights are preferred.

UV can be applied on spot locations of the paper or by flooding the page. This coating application can deepen the color of the printed area. Drying is virtually instantaneous when exposed to the correct level of UV light so projects can move quickly into the bindery.

A printed page with UV coating applied can be very shiny or flattened to a matte finish. A good example of UV coated paper is photo paper sold for home printing projects. UV coatings that are not fully cured can have a slightly sticky/tacky feel.

In commercial printing, UV-curable coatings are applied inline during the offset and digital printing process on paper substrates such as brochures, business cards, and presentation folders. The film is then exposed to ultraviolet lamps for immediate curing. Formulations can be adjusted for high-gloss or matte effects. These formulations typically include oligomer resins, reactive monomers, and photoinitiators designed for rapid photopolymerization under UV exposure. When fully cured, such coatings can improve rub/abrasion and chemical resistance relative to some aqueous or varnish finishes.

Adoption in printing expanded from the late 20th century as curing equipment and chemistries improved, supporting higher production speeds and use on diverse substrates.

== Ultraviolet coating of glass and plastic ==
Glass and plastic can be coated to diminish the amount of ultraviolet radiation that passes through. Common uses of such coating include eyeglasses and automotive windows. Photographic filters remove ultraviolet to prevent exposure of the film or sensor by invisible light. UV curable coatings can be used to impart a variety of properties to polymeric surfaces, including glare reduction, wear or scratch resistance, anti-fogging, microbial resistance, chemical resistance. Computer screens, keyboards, and most other personal electronic devices are treated with some type of UV-curable coating. Coatings are usually applied to plastic substrates via spray, dip, roll, flow and other processes. UV-curable coatings are often specified for plastic parts because the process does not require heat, which can distort the plastic shape.

== Ultraviolet coating of wood ==
The industrial wood finisher has essentially three options in types of UV-curable coatings to use—100% UV, water-reduced UV and solvent reduced UV. Each type of UV-curable coating can be applied by virtually any method of application. The selected method of application is dependent on the surface structure/property to be finished, the finish quality desired on that surface, and the production rate that finishing must achieve. Another consideration is recovery, typically UV-curable coatings are more expensive than conventional cure coatings and as such any material that does not get applied to the part would need to be recovered as efficiently as possible. The selection of the UV-curable coating type applied by any method is really a matter of finish build or thickness, the ease to achieve certain finish subtleties (gloss, leveling, etc.), and the ease of use of the coating system. In general, if 100% UV-curable coatings can be used to produce the desired finish quality, it is best to set a course of action to use them. Costs, operation expenses and reporting requirements will be most advantageous with 100% UV-curable coatings. If very thin film builds are desired, less than 100% actives may be necessary and the use of water-reduced UV-curable coatings is most preferential.

== Ultraviolet printing of aluminium beverage cans ==
When the aluminium cans are formed, they are washed and cleaned. A special coating also is applied on the inside of the can. On the printing press up to 6 different ink rollers supply the colors that coat the printing plates. (Similar process compared to offset lithography). After making contact with the rubber blanket, the can has a complete negative image per color. The process is considered wet on wet ink. After going through each color on the rotary belt, the final image is formed and a special coating is applied to each can to protect the can/colors from wear and tear. The completed cans are sent to the UV oven, that operate over 100 F and contains between six and eight 300 watt/inch UV lamps. Both inside and outside of the can are exposed to the light to ensure proper ink curing.

== Site-applied UV coatings ==
In recent years, manufacturers have formulated ultraviolet curable coatings for applications outside of a factory or laboratory environment. This technology was first developed and commercialized by Professional Coatings Inc, (Cabot Ar) for substrates such as wood, concrete, vinyl tile and LVT. Other companies such as Arboritec/UVElite and UVGreenCure have continued in the development of new technologies around coating formulation and floor curing machines. Site Applied UV Coatings are available in both 100% solid and water-based formulations. They offer the advantage of quick return to service in the case of substrates such as wood, where polyurethanes can take several days before achieving full cure, and longevity in applications such as VCT, where an acrylic finish can be reapplied several times per year and buffed routinely. The coatings are applied as traditional coatings and then cured with an ultraviolet light (Generally either a mercury discharge lamp or LED-based system) mounted to a rolling chassis or by a handheld unit.

== See also ==
- Amination – Chemical reaction
- Formulations – Putting together of components
- UV curing – Chemical process
