= Industrial computed tomography =

Computer-aided tomographic process

Animated set of computed tomography transmission images of a Logitech C500 webcam

Industrial computed tomography (CT) scanning is any computer-aided tomographic process, usually X-ray computed tomography, that uses irradiation to produce three-dimensional internal and external representations of a scanned object. Industrial CT scanning has been used in many areas of industry for internal inspection of components. Some of the key uses for industrial CT scanning have been flaw detection, failure analysis, metrology, assembly analysis and reverse engineering applications. Just as in medical imaging, industrial imaging includes both nontomographic radiography (industrial radiography) and computed tomographic radiography (computed tomography).

== Types of scanners ==
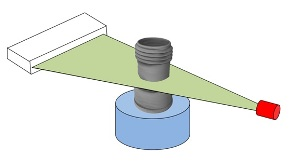
Line beam scanner

Line beam scanning is the traditional process of industrial CT scanning. X-rays are produced and the beam is collimated to create a line. The X-ray line beam is then translated across the part and data is collected by the detector. The data is then reconstructed to create a 3-D volume rendering of the part.

In cone beam scanning, the part to be scanned is placed on a rotary table. As the part rotates, the cone of X-rays produce a large number of 2D images that are collected by the detector. The 2D images are then processed to create a 3D volume rendering of the external and internal geometries of the part.

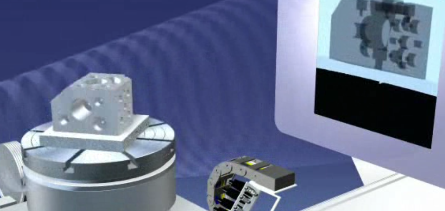
Cone beam scanner

== History ==
Industrial CT scanning technology was introduced in 1972 with the invention of the CT scanner for medical imaging by Godfrey Hounsfield. The invention earned him a Nobel Prize in medicine, which he shared with Allan McLeod Cormack. Many advances in CT scanning have allowed for its use in the industrial field for metrology in addition to the visual inspection primarily used in the medical field (medical CT scan).

== Analysis and inspection techniques ==
Various inspection uses and techniques include part-to-CAD comparisons, part-to-part comparisons, assembly and defect analysis, void analysis, wall thickness analysis, and generation of CAD data. The CAD data can be used for reverse engineering, geometric dimensioning and tolerance analysis, and production part approval.

=== Assembly ===
One of the most recognized forms of analysis using CT is for assembly, or visual analysis. CT scanning provides views inside components in their functioning position, without disassembly. Some software programs for industrial CT scanning allow for measurements to be taken from the CT dataset volume rendering. These measurements are useful for determining the clearances between assembled parts or the dimension of an individual feature.

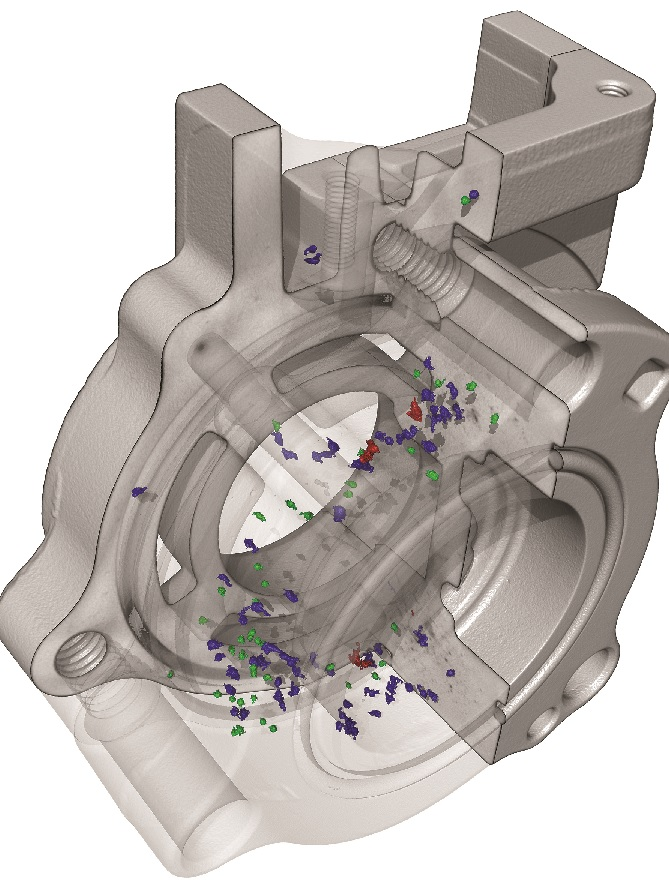
An industrial computed tomography (CT) scan conducted on an aluminum casting to identify internal failures such as voids. All color coordinated particles within casting are voids/porosity/air pockets, which can additionally be measured and are color coordinated according to size.

=== Void, crack and defect detection ===
Flight through a 3D reconstruction of a disposable pepper grinder. Glass in blue.

Traditionally, determining defects, voids and cracks within an object would require destructive testing. CT scanning can detect internal features and flaws displaying this information in 3D without destroying the part. Industrial CT scanning (3D X-ray) is used to detect flaws inside a part such as porosity, an inclusion, or a crack. It has been also used to detect the origin and propagation of damages in concrete.

Metal casting and moulded plastic components are typically prone to porosity because of cooling processes, transitions between thick and thin walls, and material properties. Void analysis can be used to locate, measure, and analyze voids inside plastic or metal components.

=== Geometric dimensioning and tolerancing analysis ===
Traditionally, without destructive testing, full metrology has only been performed on the exterior dimensions of components, such as with a coordinate-measuring machine (CMM) or with a vision system to map exterior surfaces. Internal inspection methods would require using a 2D X-ray of the component or the use of destructive testing. Industrial CT scanning allows for full non-destructive metrology. With unlimited geometrical complexity, 3D printing allows for complex internal features to be created with no impact on cost, such features are not accessible using traditional CMM. The first 3D printed artefact that is optimised for characterisation of form using computed tomography CT

=== Image-based finite element methods ===
Image-based finite element method converts the 3D image data from X-ray computed tomography directly into meshes for finite element analysis. Benefits of this method include modelling complex geometries (e.g. composite materials) or accurately modelling "as manufactured" components at the micro-scale.

== Trends and Developments ==
The industrial computed tomography market is forecast to reach a size of USD 773.45 million to USD 1,116.5 million between 2029 and 2030. Regional trends show that strong market growth is expected, particularly in the Asia-Pacific region, but also in North America and Europe, due to strict safety regulations and preventive maintenance of industrial equipment. Growth is being driven primarily by the ongoing development of CT devices and services that enable precise and non-destructive testing of components. Innovations such as the use of artificial intelligence for automated fault analyses and the development of mobile CT systems are expanding the possibilities.

== Developments for Forensic Science ==
Computed Tomography (CT) has become an increasingly valuable tool in forensic science, particularly in conducting virtual autopsies. Unlike traditional autopsies, which require invasive procedures, CT scans allow for non-invasive internal examinations of the body, producing detailed 3D images of bones, organs, and soft tissues. This technology is especially useful for detecting fractures, foreign objects (such as bullets or shrapnel), gas embolisms, and signs of trauma that may not be immediately visible externally. CT scans can preserve forensic evidence more effectively and are particularly beneficial in cases involving mass disasters, decomposition, or cultural and religious objections to dissection. Furthermore, digital imaging from CT can be stored and reviewed multiple times, aiding both legal investigations and educational purposes. Overall, CT has enhanced the accuracy, efficiency, and accessibility of post-mortem examinations in forensic contexts.

=== Glossary of Forensic Science CT Scanning Uses ===
Assessment of trauma
Differentiation between antemortem (before death) and postmortem (after death) injuries.
Analysis of gas embolisms
Identification of air or gas in blood vessels, which may indicate drowning, decompression sickness, or medical malpractice.
Age estimation
Evaluation of skeletal maturity and dental development in unidentified remains.
Burn victim analysis
Examining internal structures in severely burned bodies when traditional autopsy is limited.
Comparison with antemortem data
Matching postmortem CT scans with medical imaging from a person’s lifetime for identification.
Cultural/religious sensitivity
Alternative to invasive autopsies when cutting open a body is not permitted.
Decomposition studies
Monitoring changes in tissues and gases during the decomposition process.
Detection of fractures
Identification of skull, rib, and other skeletal fractures, especially those not visible externally.
Documentation and archiving
Permanent, revisitable digital records of body condition and evidence.
Explosion and blast injury analysis
Assessment of internal damage patterns caused by high-pressure events.
Facial reconstruction support
High-resolution skull imaging for reconstructing a face digitally.
Identification of pathologies
Detection of diseases, infections, or chronic conditions that may relate to cause of death.
Mass disaster victim identification
Efficient imaging of multiple bodies for quick identification and trauma assessment.
Virtual autopsies (virtopsies)
Non-invasive internal examinations of deceased individuals.
Visualization of foreign objects
Location and analysis of bullets, shrapnel, or other embedded materials.

== See also ==
- CT scan
- Industrial radiography
- Cone beam computed tomography, applications in quality control and metrology.
- PCB reverse engineering, an application of industrial CT to image printed circuit boards non-destructively.
