= Sherlock Automated Design Analysis =

Sherlock Automated Design Analysis is a software tool developed by DfR Solutions for analyzing, grading, and certifying the expected reliability of products at the circuit card assembly level. Based on the physics of failure, Sherlock predicts failure mechanism-specific failure rates over time using a combination of finite element method and material properties to capture stress values and first order analytical equations to evaluate damage evolution. The software is designed for use by design and reliability engineers and managers in the electronics industry. DfR Solutions is based in Beltsville, Maryland, USA, and was acquired by Ansys in May 2019.

== Approach ==
Users upload either a complete design package, like ODB++ or IPC-2581, or individual data packets, such as Gerber, Bill of Materials, and Pick and Place files.

Sherlock incorporates stresses from a variety of environments into its physics-based prediction algorithms, including elevated temperature, thermal cycling, vibrations (random and harmonic), mechanical shock and electrical stresses (voltage, current, power). Sherlock then performs several different types of reliability analysis and provides the useful (constant failure rate) and wear out (increasing failure rate) portions of the life curve for each mechanism-component combination. The specific mechanisms that are evaluated and predicted include low-cycle solder fatigue due to thermal cycling, high-cycle solder fatigue due to vibration, solder cracking/component cracking/pad cratering due to mechanical shock or excessive flexure, lead fatigue, wire bond fatigue, via fatigue, electromigration, time dependent dielectric breakdown, hot-carrier injection, and negative bias temperature instability. Published research has indicated that the physics of failure-based predictions are highly accurate and are now used to validate other techniques.

These individual life curves are then summed to provide a physics-based reliability curve for the overall product. Sherlock also provides design rule checks (DRC) for board-level design (schematic and layout) and an overall reliability score. The reliability scoring, which is provided for the overall products – as well as individual scores and commentary for each area of analysis is used when physics-based quantitative predictions are not possible. The analysis is delivered both in PDF and HTML format. Depending on the types of analysis run and the data entered to create the analysis, reports can run between 20 and over 200 pages in length.

The semiconductor module is in compliance with SAE ARP 6338 and is being considered as a replacement to traditional empirical reliability prediction methods (MIL-HDBK-217, Telcordia SR-332, FIDES, and Siemens SN29500) in predicting the reliability of semiconductor devices.

A graphical interface allows users to examine results, make iterations, and pre-perform analyses as necessary. The software does not allow the user to make permanent changes to the electronic design. This activity takes place within the original EDA or CAD software. Sherlock is compatible with Abaqus, Ansys, and Siemens NX.

== Outputs ==
Sherlock Automated Design Analysis produces the following outputs:

- A reliability score – benchmarks the risk of the design compared to industry best practices
- Predicted performance over time – allows product teams to project the product performance over its lifecycle
- A physical map of reliability issues –identifies the likely points of failure
- A histogram – groups parts by degree of risk
- Design recommendations –provide solutions to identified problems for rapid resolution

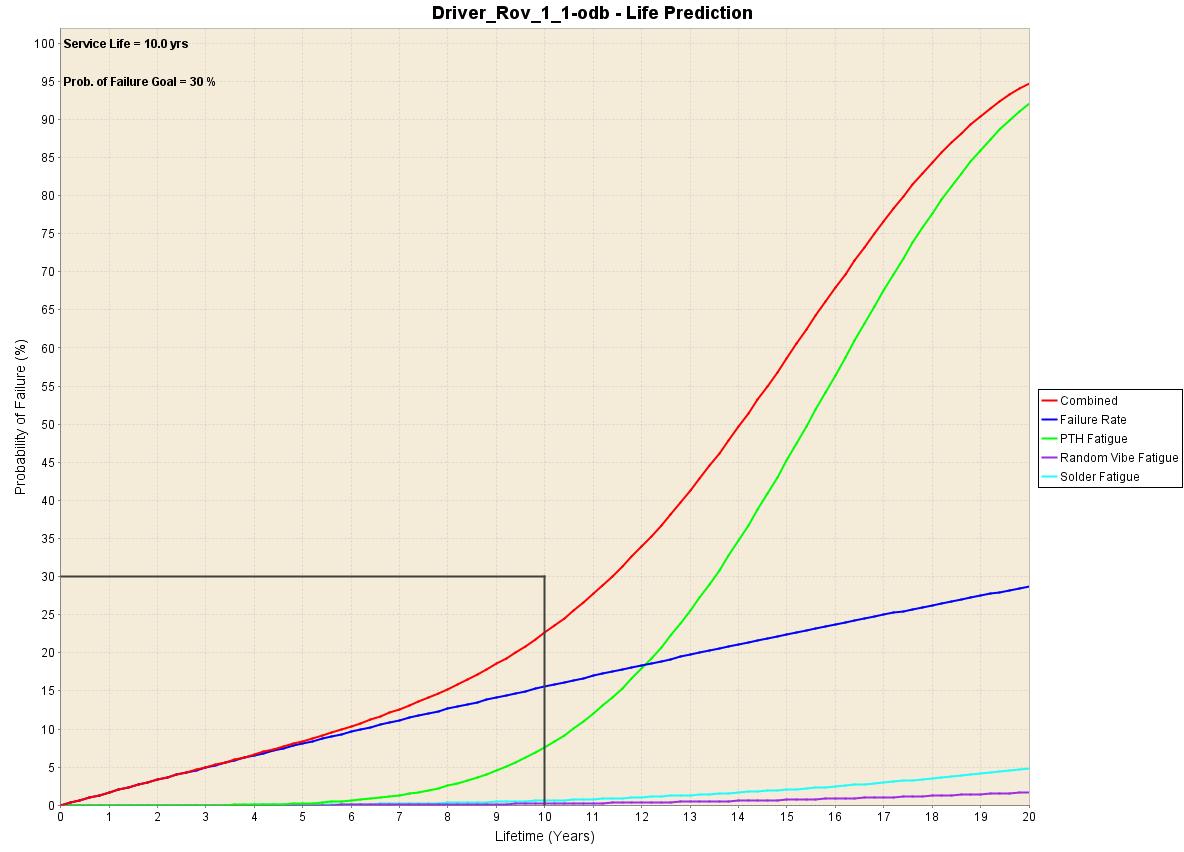
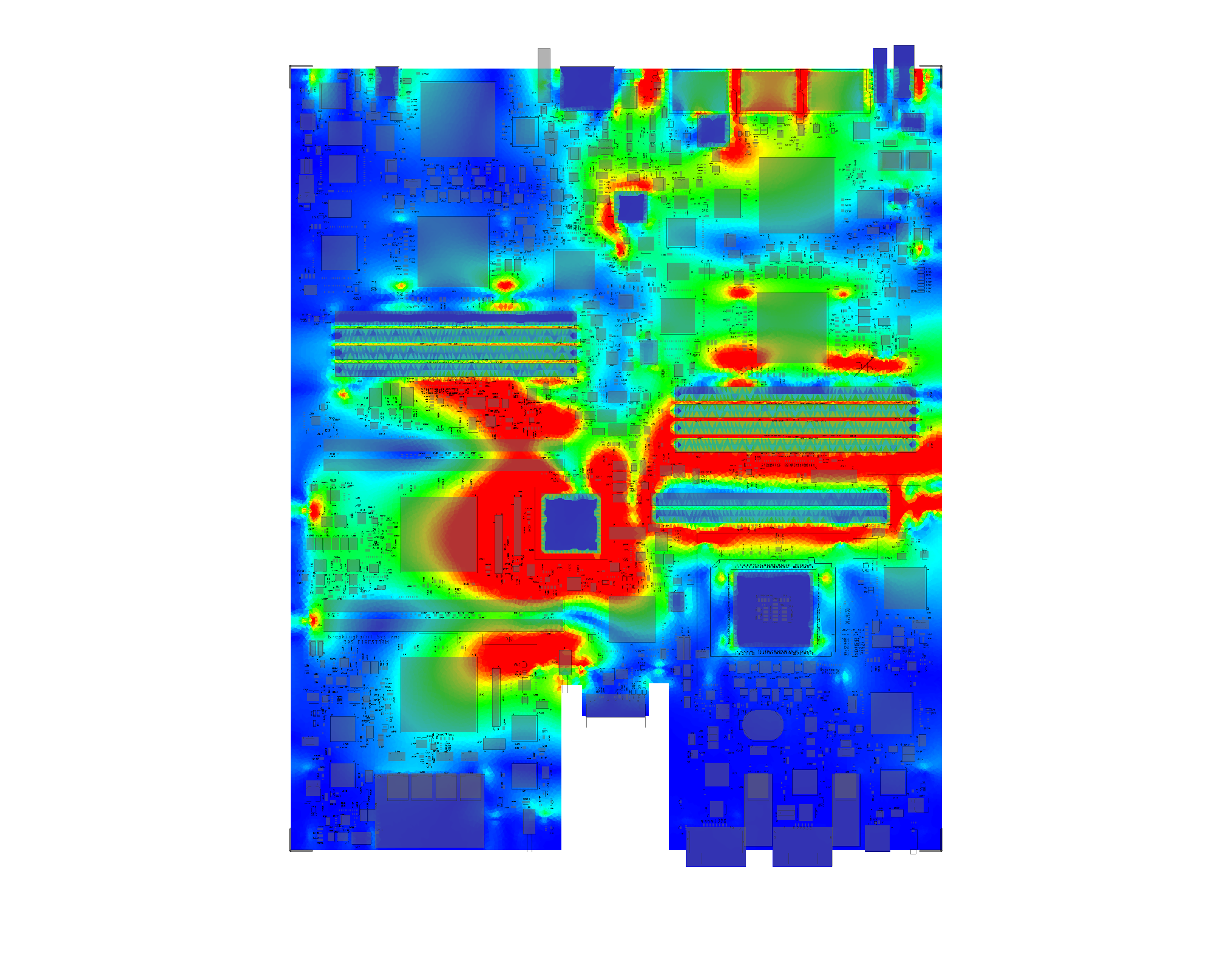

== Version history ==
Sherlock Automated Design Analysis was launched in April 2011. Subsequent releases include

- Version 3.0 - July 2013
- Version 3.1 - January 2014
- Version 3.2 - October 2014
- Version 4.0 - April 2015
- Version 4.1 - July 2015
- Version 4.2 - February 2016
- Version 5.0 - July 2016
- Version 5.1 - January 2017
- Version 5.2 - April 2017
- Version 5.3 - September 2017
- Version 2020R1 - January 2020
- Version 2020R2 - June 2020

== Market acceptance ==
A company has reported requiring suppliers use Sherlock to reduce risk and help accelerate design validation and product verification.
