= Hot-carrier injection =

Phenomenon in solid-state electronic devices

Hot carrier injection (HCI) is a phenomenon in solid-state electronic devices where an electron or a "hole" gains sufficient kinetic energy to overcome a potential barrier necessary to break an interface state. The term "hot" refers to the effective temperature used to model carrier density, not to the overall temperature of the device. Since the charge carriers can become trapped in the gate dielectric of a MOS transistor, the switching characteristics of the transistor can be permanently changed. Hot-carrier injection is one of the mechanisms that adversely affects the reliability of semiconductors of solid-state devices.

== Physics ==
The term "hot carrier injection" usually refers to the effect in MOSFETs, where a carrier is injected from the conducting channel in the silicon substrate to the gate dielectric, which usually is made of silicon dioxide (SiO_{2}).

To become "hot" and enter the conduction band of SiO_{2}, an electron must gain a kinetic energy of ~3.2 eV. For holes, the valence band offset in this case dictates they must have a kinetic energy of 4.6 eV. The term "hot electron" comes from the effective temperature term used when modelling carrier density (i.e., with a Fermi-Dirac function) and does not refer to the bulk temperature of the semiconductor (which can be physically cold, although the warmer it is, the higher the population of hot electrons it will contain all else being equal).

The term "hot electron" was originally introduced to describe non-equilibrium electrons (or holes) in semiconductors. More broadly, the term describes electron distributions describable by the Fermi function, but with an elevated effective temperature. This greater energy affects the mobility of charge carriers and as a consequence affects how they travel through a semiconductor device.

Hot electrons can tunnel out of the semiconductor material, instead of recombining with a hole or being conducted through the material to a collector. Consequent effects include increased leakage current and possible damage to the encasing dielectric material if the hot carrier disrupts the atomic structure of the dielectric.

Hot electrons can be created when a high-energy photon of electromagnetic radiation (such as light) strikes a semiconductor. The energy from the photon can be transferred to an electron, exciting the electron out of the valence band, and forming an electron-hole pair. If the electron receives enough energy to leave the valence band, and to surpass the conduction band, it becomes a hot electron. Such electrons are characterized by high effective temperatures. Because of the high effective temperatures, hot electrons are very mobile, and likely to leave the semiconductor and travel into other surrounding materials.

In some semiconductor devices, the energy dissipated by hot electrons phonon represents an inefficiency as energy is lost as heat. For instance, some solar cells rely on the photovoltaic properties of semiconductors to convert light to electricity. In such cells, the hot electron effect is the reason that a portion of the light energy is lost to heat rather than converted to electricity.

Hot electrons arise generically at low temperatures even in degenerate semiconductors or metals. There are a number of models to describe the hot-electron effect. The simplest predicts an electron-phonon (e-p) interaction based on a clean three-dimensional free-electron model. Hot electron effect models illustrate a correlation between power dissipated, the electron gas temperature and overheating.

== Effects on transistors ==
In MOSFETs, hot electrons have sufficient energy to tunnel through the thin gate oxide to show up as gate current, or as substrate leakage current. In a MOSFET, when a gate is positive, and the switch is on, the device is designed with the intent that electrons will flow laterally through the conductive channel, from the source to the drain. Hot electrons may jump from the channel region or from the drain, for instance, and enter the gate or the substrate. These hot electrons do not contribute to the amount of current flowing through the channel as intended and instead are a leakage current.

Attempts to correct or compensate for the hot electron effect in a MOSFET may involve locating a diode in reverse bias at gate terminal or other manipulations of the device (such as lightly doped drains or double-doped drains).

When electrons are accelerated in the channel, they gain energy along the mean free path. This energy is lost in two different ways:

1. The carrier hits an atom in the substrate. Then the collision creates a cold carrier and an additional electron-hole pair. In the case of nMOS transistors, additional electrons are collected by the channel and additional holes are evacuated by the substrate.
2. The carrier hits a Si-H bond and break the bond. An interface state is created and the hydrogen atom is released in the substrate.

The probability to hit either an atom or a Si-H bond is random, and the average energy involved in each process is the same in both case.

This is the reason why the substrate current is monitored during HCI stress. A high substrate current means a large number of created electron-hole pairs and thus an efficient Si-H bond breakage mechanism.

When interface states are created, the threshold voltage is modified and the subthreshold slope is degraded. This leads to lower current, and degrades the operating frequency of integrated circuit.

== Scaling ==
Advances in semiconductor manufacturing techniques and ever increasing demand for faster and more complex integrated circuits (ICs) have driven the associated Metal–Oxide–Semiconductor field-effect transistor (MOSFET) to scale to smaller dimensions.

However, it has not been possible to scale down the supply voltage used to operate these ICs proportionately due to factors such as compatibility with previous generation circuits, noise margin, power and delay requirements, and non-scaling of threshold voltage, subthreshold slope, and parasitic capacitance.

As a result, internal electric fields increase in aggressively scaled MOSFETs, which comes with the additional benefit of increased carrier velocities (up to velocity saturation), and hence increased switching speed, but also presents a major reliability problem for the long term operation of these devices, as high fields induce hot carrier injection which affects device reliability.

Large electric fields in MOSFETs imply the presence of high-energy carriers, referred to as "hot carriers". These hot carriers that have sufficiently high energies and momenta to allow them to be injected from the semiconductor into the surrounding dielectric films such as the gate and sidewall oxides as well as the buried oxide in the case of silicon on insulator (SOI) MOSFETs.

== Reliability impact ==
The presence of such mobile carriers in the oxides triggers numerous physical damage processes that can drastically change the device characteristics over prolonged periods. The accumulation of damage can eventually cause the circuit to fail as key parameters such as threshold voltage shift due to such damage. The accumulation of damage resulting degradation in device behavior due to hot carrier injection is called "hot carrier degradation".

The useful life-time of circuits and integrated circuits based on such a MOS device are thus affected by the life-time of the MOS device itself. To assure that integrated circuits manufactured with minimal geometry devices will not have their useful life impaired, the life-time of the component MOS devices must have their HCI degradation well understood. Failure to accurately characterize HCI life-time effects can ultimately affect business costs such as warranty and support costs and impact marketing and sales promises for a foundry or IC manufacturer.

== Relationship to radiation effects ==
Hot carrier degradation is fundamentally the same as the ionization radiation effect known as the total dose damage to semiconductors, as experienced in space systems due to solar proton, electron, X-ray and gamma ray exposure.

== HCI and NOR flash memory cells ==
HCI is the basis of operation for a number of non-volatile memory technologies such as EPROM cells. As soon as the potential detrimental influence of HC injection on the circuit reliability was recognized, several fabrication strategies were devised to reduce it without compromising the circuit performance.

NOR flash memory exploits the principle of hot carriers injection by deliberately injecting carriers across the gate oxide to charge the floating gate. This charge alters the MOS transistor threshold voltage to represent a logic '0' state. An uncharged floating gate represents a '1' state. Erasing the NOR Flash memory cell removes stored charge through the process of Fowler–Nordheim tunneling.

Because of the damage to the oxide caused by normal NOR Flash operation, HCI damage is one of the factors that cause the number of write-erase cycles to be limited. Because the ability to hold charge and the formation of damage traps in the oxide affects the ability to have distinct '1' and '0' charge states, HCI damage results in the closing of the non-volatile memory logic margin window over time. The number of write-erase cycles at which '1' and '0' can no longer be distinguished defines the endurance of a non-volatile memory.

== See also ==
- Time-dependent gate oxide breakdown (also time-dependent dielectric breakdown, TDDB)
- Electromigration (EM)
- Negative bias temperature instability (NBTI)
- Stress migration
- Lattice scattering
- Theory of solar cells
