= Highly accelerated life test =

Stress testing methodology for enhancing product reliability

A highly accelerated life test (HALT) is a stress testing methodology for enhancing product reliability in which prototypes are stressed to a much higher degree than expected from actual use in order to identify weaknesses in the design or manufacture of the product. Manufacturing and research and development organizations in the electronics, computer, medical, and military industries use HALT to improve product reliability.

HALT can be effectively used multiple times over a product's life time. During product development, it can find design weakness earlier in the product lifecycle when changes are much less costly to make. By finding weaknesses and making changes early, HALT can lower product development costs and compress time to market. When HALT is used at the time a product is being introduced into the market, it can expose problems caused by new manufacturing processes. When used after a product has been introduced into the market, HALT can be used to audit product reliability caused by changes in components, manufacturing processes, suppliers, etc.

== Overview ==
Highly accelerated life testing (HALT) techniques are important in uncovering many of the weak links of a new product. These discovery tests rapidly find weaknesses using accelerated stress conditions. The goal of HALT is to proactively find weaknesses and fix them, thereby increasing product reliability. Because of its accelerated nature, HALT is typically faster and less expensive than traditional testing techniques.

HALT is a test technique called test-to-fail, where a product is tested until failure. HALT does not help to determine or demonstrate the reliability value or failure probability in field. Many accelerated life tests are test-to-pass, meaning they are used to demonstrate the product life or reliability.

It is highly recommended to perform HALT in the initial phases of product development to uncover weak links in a product, so that there is better chance and more time to modify and improve the product.

HALT uses several stress factors (decided by a reliability test engineer) and/or the combination of various factors. Commonly used stress factors are temperature, vibration, and humidity for electronics and mechanical products. Other factors can include voltage, current, power cycling and combinations of them.

== Typical HALT procedures ==
Environmental stresses are applied in a HALT procedure, eventually reaching a level significantly beyond that expected during use. The stresses used in HALT are typically hot and cold temperatures, temperature cycles, random vibration, power margining, and power cycling. The product under test is in operation during HALT and is continuously monitored for failures. As stress-induced failures occur, the cause should be determined, and if possible, the problem should be repaired so that the test can continue to find other weaknesses.

Output of the HALT gives you:

1. Multiple failure modes in the product before it is subjected to demonstration testing
2. Operating limits of the product (upper and lower). These can be compared with a designer's margin or supplier specifications
3. Destruct limits of the product (limit at which product functionality is lost and no recovery can be made)

== Test chambers ==
A specialized environmental chamber is required for HALT. A suitable chamber also has to be capable of applying pseudo-random vibration with a suitable profile in relation to frequency. The HALT chamber should be capable of applying random vibration energy from 2 to 10,000 Hz in 6 degrees of freedom and temperatures from -100 to +200°C. Sometimes HALT chambers are called repetitive shock chambers because pneumatic air hammers are used to produce vibration. The chamber should also be capable of rapid changes in temperature, 50°C per minute should be considered a minimum rate of change. Usually high power resistive heating elements are used for heating and liquid nitrogen (LN_{2}) is used for cooling.

== Fixtures ==
Test fixtures must transmit vibration to the item under test. They must also be open in design or use air circulation to produce rapid temperature change to internal components. Test fixtures can use simple channels to attach the product to the chamber table or more complicated fixtures sometimes are fabricated.

== Monitoring and failure analysis ==
The equipment under test must be monitored so that if the equipment fails under test, the failure is detected. Monitoring is typically performed with thermocouple sensors, vibration accelerometers, multimeters and data loggers. Common causes of failures during HALT are poor product design, workmanship, and poor manufacturing. Failures to individual components such as resistors, capacitors, diodes, printed circuit boards occur because of these issues. Failure types found during HALT testing are associated with the infant mortality region of the bathtub curve.

== Military application ==
HALT is conducted before qualification testing. By catching failures early, flaws are found earlier in the acceptance process, eliminating repetitive later-stage reviews.

== See also ==
- Highly accelerated stress test (HAST)
- Reliability engineering § Accelerated testing
- Accelerated life testing – Process of testing a product
- Fault injection
