= QBD =

QBD may stand for:

- QBD (electronics)
- Quantum brain dynamics, a Quantum mind theory
- Quasi-birth-death process
- Quality by Design (QbD)
- Queen Black Dragon, a boss monster in the MMORPG RuneScape
- Queen's Bench Division
- Queensland Book Depot
- Quick Business Deposit, a trademark of Bank of America
