= Accelerated life testing =

Process of testing a product

Accelerated life testing is the process of testing a product by subjecting it to conditions (stress, strain, temperatures, voltage, vibration rate, pressure etc.) in excess of its normal service parameters in an effort to uncover faults and potential modes of failure in a short amount of time. By analyzing the product's response to such tests, engineers can make predictions about the service life and maintenance intervals of a product.

In polymers, testing may be done at elevated temperatures to produce a result in a shorter amount of time than it could be produced at ambient temperatures. Many mechanical properties of polymers have an Arrhenius type relationship with respect to time and temperature (for example, creep, stress relaxation, and tensile properties). If one conducts short tests at elevated temperatures, that data can be used to extrapolate the behavior of the polymer at room temperature, avoiding the need to do lengthy, and hence expensive tests.

== Purpose ==
ALT is primarily used to speed up tests. This is particularly useful in several cases:

- Low failure - Testing even a very large sample at normal conditions would yield few or no failures in a reasonable time.
- High longevity - The product must be reliable for a much longer time than can be reasonably tested at normal conditions.
- High wear-out - The primary cause of failure occurs over an extended amount of time.

For instance, a reliability test on circuits that must last years at use conditions (high longevity) would need to yield results in a much shorter time. If the test wanted to estimate how frequently the circuits needed to be replaced, then the category of low failure would also be applicable. Furthermore, if the circuits wore out from gradual use rather than extreme use (such as a large sudden shock), the wear out category would be involved. If a sudden shock was the primary cause of failure, a Highly Accelerated Life Test may be more appropriate.

== Setting up a test ==
Designing a test involves considering what factors affect the test object, what you already know about the test object's behavior, and what you want to learn from the test.

=== Test Conditions ===
All factors thought to influence the test object should be involved and tests should be conducted at various levels of each factor. Higher stress levels will speed up the test more however the cause of failure or other response measured must not be changed. For instance, melting components in a circuit would alter why the circuit failed. Increasing the number of tests or the number of test objects in each test generally increases how precisely one can infer the test object's behavior at operating conditions.

=== Picking a Model ===
A model is an equation that accurately relates a test object's performance to the levels of stress on it. This can be referred to as an acceleration model, with any constants called acceleration factors. The acceleration model is usually related to the types of materials or components tested. A few equations used for acceleration models are the Arrhenius for high temperature fatigue, Eyring for temperature and humidity, and the Blattau model for temperature cycling.

When the model is known in advance the test only needs to identify the parameters for the model, however it is necessary to ensure that the model being used has been well verified. Established models must show agreement between extrapolations from accelerated data and observed data across a range of stress factors.

When the appropriate model is not known in advance, or there exist multiple accepted models, the test must estimate what model fits best based on the context of the test and results from testing. Even if two models fit data at high stresses equally well, they may differ by orders of magnitude at lower stresses. This issue can be approached by more tests at a greater range of stresses however the cause of failure must remain unchanged. A possible pre-experiment approach to minimize this is to estimate what data you expect from testing, fit a model to the data, and determine if one would be able to make reliable conclusions if everything went as expected.

== Acceleration Factors ==
Inference from the results of an accelerated life test requires being able to relate the test object's response (lifespan, corrosion, efficiency, etc...) to the levels of applied stress factors over time.

How one factors in the effect of time depends largely on what one is measuring. For instance, a test that is measuring lifespan may look only at the mean time to failure of the test objects, or it may try to fit a statistical distribution to the data. This is usually referred to as a life distribution, the probability density function of which represents the proportion of products failing at a given time. Several distributions for this purpose are the exponential, Weibull, log-normal, and gamma distributions. In any case, the parameters would be related to the test subjects and the levels of the stress factors being tested.

As a simplified example, consider a test object with a life distribution that roughly matches a normal distribution. Tests at various stress levels would yield different values for the mean and standard deviation of the distribution. (its parameters) One would then use a known model or attempt to fit a model to relate how each stress factor influenced the distributions parameters. This relation would then be used to estimate the life distribution at operating conditions.

== Step-Stress Accelerated Life Test ==
A step stress ALT is a variant of ALT that tests a component at multiple stress levels, one after the other. Components that survive one test are immediately subjected to the next. These are widely modeled under the assumption that survival life of a product depends only on the current level of stress and how many test subjects have failed so far. Step stress ALT can increment low to high, high to low, or through a mix of levels. A step stress ALT test that is interested in extrapolating a life distribution to constant operating conditions must be able to relate the life distribution observed under changing stresses to one of constant stresses.

== See also ==
- Research and development
- Product management
- Service life
- Reliability (engineering)
- Highly Accelerated Life Test
- Accelerated aging
- AFT model
- Cox model
- Fatigue testing
- Fault injection
