= TDDB =

TDDB is an initialism that may refer to:

- Tentera Darat Diraja Brunei, Malay for Royal Brunei Land Force
- Time-dependent dielectric breakdown (or Time-dependent gate oxide breakdown), a failure mechanism in MOSFETs, when the gate oxide breaks down as a result of long-time application of relatively low electric field (as opposite to immediate breakdown, which is caused by strong electric field)
