= Highly accelerated stress test =

The highly accelerated stress test (HAST) method was first proposed by Jeffrey E. Gunn, Sushil K. Malik, and Purabi M. Mazumdar of IBM.

The acceleration factor for elevated humidity is empirically derived to be

$$AF_\text{H} = e^{\text{const} \cdot (RH_\text{s}^n - RH_\text{o}^n)},$$

$\text{const}$ is a value which normally goes from 0.1 to 0.15

where RH_{s} is the stressed humidity, RH_{o} is the operating-environment humidity, and n is an empirically derived constant (usually 1 < n < 5).

The acceleration factor for elevated temperature is derived to be

$$AF_T = e^{(E_\text{a}/k)(1/T_\text{o} - 1/T_\text{s})},$$

where E_{a} is the activation energy for the temperature-induced failure (most often 0.7 eV for electronics), k is the Boltzmann constant, T_{o} is the operating temperature in kelvins, and T_{s} is the stressed temperature.

Therefore the total acceleration factor for unbiased HAST testing is

$$AF_\text{HAST} = AF_\text{H} \cdot AF_T =
e^{\text{const} \cdot (RH_\text{s}^n - RH_\text{o}^n)}
e^{(E_\text{a}/k)(1/T_\text{o} - 1/T_\text{s})}.$$

== See also ==
- Highly accelerated life test (HALT) – Stress testing methodology for enhancing product reliability
- Reliability engineering § Accelerated testing
- Accelerated life testing – Process of testing a product
- Fault injection
