= HTOL =

HTOL can be an abbreviation for:

- High temperature operating life, a method of estimating the operating life of a product
- Horizontal take-off and landing, as opposed to Vertical take-off and landing
  - STOL, Short take-off and landing
  - CTOL, Conventional take-off and landing
  - STOBAR, Short take-off but arrested recovery
  - CATOBAR, Catapult-assisted take-off but arrested recovery

== See also ==
- HOTOL, a British spaceplane design of the 1980s
