= NBTI =

NBTI (with different capitalizations) may refer to:

- Negative-bias temperature instability, a reliability issue in integrated circuits design
- Niobium-titanium (NbTi), an industrially used superconducting alloy
