= Vibration fatigue =

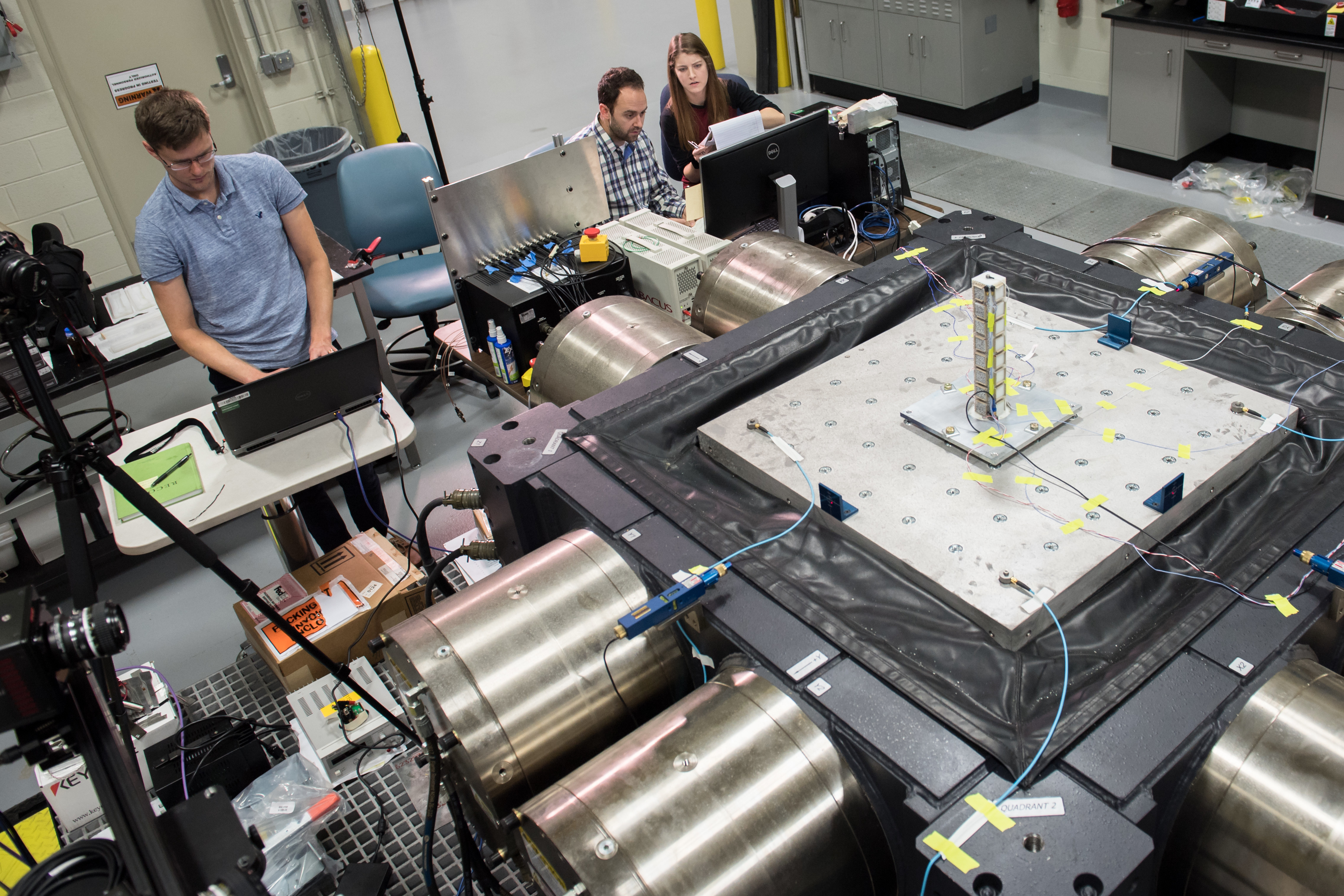
Researchers using a machine known as a "shaker" to study the effects of multi-axial vibrations, 2019

Vibration fatigue is a mechanical engineering term describing material fatigue, caused by forced vibration of random nature. An excited structure responds according to its natural-dynamics modes, which results in a dynamic stress load in the material points. The process of material fatigue is thus governed largely by the shape of the excitation profile and the response it produces. As the profiles of excitation and response are preferably analyzed in the frequency domain it is practical to use fatigue life evaluation methods, that can operate on the data in frequency-domain, s power spectral density (PSD).

A crucial part of a vibration fatigue analysis is the modal analysis, that exposes the natural modes and frequencies of the vibrating structure and enables accurate prediction of the local stress responses for the given excitation. Only then, when the stress responses are known, can vibration fatigue be successfully characterized.

The more classical approach of fatigue evaluation consists of cycle counting, using the rainflow algorithm and summation by means of the Palmgren-Miner linear damage hypothesis, that appropriately sums the damages of respective cycles. When the time history is not known, because the load is random (e.g. a car on a rough road or a wind driven turbine), those cycles can not be counted. Multiple time histories can be simulated for a given random process, but such procedure is cumbersome and computationally expensive.

Vibration-fatigue methods offer a more effective approach, which estimates fatigue life based on moments of the PSD. This way, a value is estimated, that would otherwise be calculated with the time-domain approach. When dealing with many material nodes, experiencing different responses (e.g. a model in a FEM package), time-histories need not be simulated. It then becomes viable, with the use of vibration-fatigue methods, to calculate fatigue life in many points on the structure and successfully predict where the failure will most probably occur.

== Vibration-fatigue-life estimation ==
=== Random load description ===
In a random process, the amplitude can not be described as a function of time, because of its probabilistic nature. However, certain statistical properties can be extracted from a signal sample, representing a realization of a random process, provided the latter is ergodic. An important characteristics for the field of vibration fatigue is the amplitude probability density function, that describes the statistical distribution of peak amplitudes. Ideally, the probability of cycle amplitudes, describing the load severity, could then be deduced directly. However, as this is not always possible, the sought-after probability is often estimated empirically.

=== Effects of structural dynamics ===
First natural mode of a cantilever beam.

Random excitation of the structure produces different responses, depending on the natural dynamics of the structure in question. Different natural modes get excited and each greatly affects the stress distribution in material. The standard procedure is to calculate frequency response functions for the analyzed structure and then obtain the stress responses, based on given loading or excitation. By exciting different modes, the spread of vibration energy over a frequency range directly affects the durability of the structure. Thus the structural dynamics analysis is a key part of vibration-fatigue evaluation.

=== Vibration-fatigue methods ===
Calculation of damage intensity is straightforward once the cycle amplitude distribution is known. This distribution can be obtained from a time-history simply by counting cycles. To obtain it from the PSD another approach must be taken.

Various vibration-fatigue methods estimate damage intensity based on moments of the PSD, which characterize the statistical properties of the random process. The formulas for calculating such estimate are empirical (with very few exceptions) and are based on numerous simulations of random processes with known PSD. As a consequence, the accuracy of those methods varies, depending on analyzed response spectra, material parameters and the method itself - some are more accurate than others.

The most commonly used method is the one developed by T. Dirlik in 1985. Recent research on frequency-domain methods of fatigue-life estimation compared well established methods and also recent ones; conclusion showed that the methods by Zhao and Baker, developed in 1992 and by Benasciutti and Tovo, developed in 2004 are also very suitable for vibration-fatigue analysis. For narrow-band approximation of random process analytical expression for damage intensity is given by Miles. There are some approaches with adaptation of narrow-band approximation; Wirsching and Light proposed the empirical correction factor in 1980 and Benasciutti presented α_{0.75} in 2004. In 2008, Gao and Moan published a spectral method that combines three narrow-band processes. Implementation of those method is given in the Python open-source FLife package.

== Applications ==
Vibration fatigue methods find use wherever the structure experiences loading, that is caused by a random process. These can be the forces that bumps on the road extort on the car chassis, the wind blowing on the wind turbine, waves hitting an offshore construction or a marine vessel. Such loads are first characterized statistically, by measurement and analysis. The data is then used in the product design process.

The computational effectiveness of vibration-fatigue methods in contrast to the classical approach, enables their use in combination with FEM software packages, to evaluate fatigue after the loading is known and the dynamic analysis has been performed. Use of the vibration-fatigue methods is well-suited, as structural analysis is studied in the frequency-domain.

Common practice in the automotive industry is the use of accelerated vibration tests. During the test, a part or a product is exposed to vibration, that are in correlation with those expected during the service-life of the product. To shorten the testing time, the amplitudes are amplified. The excitation spectra used are broad-band and can be evaluated most effectively using vibration-fatigue methods.

== See also ==
- Fatigue (material)
- Structural failure
- Vibration
- Structural dynamics
- Modal analysis
- Random vibration
- Rainflow-counting algorithm
- Seismic analysis
- Solder Fatigue
