= Robustness testing =

Quality assurance testing to determine the robustness of software

Robustness testing is any quality assurance methodology focused on testing the robustness of software. Robustness testing has also been used to describe the process of verifying the robustness (i.e. correctness) of test cases in a test process. ANSI and IEEE have defined robustness as the degree to which a system or component can function correctly in the presence of invalid inputs or stressful environmental conditions.

The term "robustness testing" was first used by the Ballista project at Carnegie Mellon University. They performed testing of operating systems for dependability based on the data types of POSIX API, producing complete system crashes in some systems. The term was also used by OUSPG and VTT researchers taking part in the PROTOS project in the context of software security testing. Eventually the term fuzzing (which security people use for mostly non-intelligent and random robustness testing) extended to also cover model-based robustness testing.

== Methods ==
=== Fault injection ===
Fault injection is a testing method that can be used for checking the robustness of systems. During the process, testing engineers inject faults into systems and observe the system's resiliency. Test engineers can develop efficient methods which aid fault injection to find critical faults in the system.

== See also ==
- Robustness (computer science)
- Fault injection
