= Solder fatigue =

Degradation of solder due to deformation under cyclic loading

Solder fatigue is the mechanical degradation of solder due to deformation under cyclic loading. This can often occur at stress levels below the yield stress of solder as a result of repeated temperature fluctuations, mechanical vibrations, or mechanical loads. Techniques to evaluate solder fatigue behavior include finite element analysis and semi-analytical closed-form equations.

== Overview ==
Solder is a metal alloy used to form electrical, thermal, and mechanical interconnections between the component and printed circuit board (PCB) substrate in an electronic assembly. Although other forms of cyclic loading are known to cause solder fatigue, it has been estimated that the largest portion of electronic failures are thermomechanically driven due to temperature cycling. Under thermal cycling, stresses are generated in the solder due to coefficient of thermal expansion (CTE) mismatches. This causes the solder joints to experience non-recoverable deformation via creep and plasticity that accumulates and leads to degradation and eventual fracture.

Historically, tin-lead solders were common alloys used in the electronics industry. Although they are still used in select industries and applications, lead-free solders have become significantly more popular due to RoHS regulatory requirements. This new trend increased the need to understand the behavior of lead-free solders.

Much work has been done to characterize the creep-fatigue behavior of various solder alloys and develop predictive life damage models using a Physics of Failure approach. These models are often used when trying to assess solder joint reliability. The fatigue life of a solder joint depends on several factors including: the alloy type and resulting microstructure, the joint geometry, the component material properties, the PCB substrate material properties, the loading conditions, and the boundary conditions of the assembly.

== Thermomechanical solder fatigue ==
During a product's operational lifetime it undergoes temperature fluctuations from application specific temperature excursions and self-heating due to component power dissipation. Global and local mismatches of coefficient of thermal expansion (CTE) between the component, component leads, PCB substrate, and system level effects drive stresses in the interconnects (i.e. solder joints). Repeated temperature cycling eventually leads to thermomechanical fatigue.

The deformation characteristics of various solder alloys can be described at the microscale due to the differences in composition and resulting microstructure. Compositional differences lead to variations in phase(s), grain size, and intermetallics. This affects susceptibility to deformation mechanisms such as dislocation motion, diffusion, and grain boundary sliding. During thermal cycling, the solder's microstructure (grains/phases) will tend to coarsen as energy is dissipated from the joint. This eventually leads to crack initiation and propagation which can be described as accumulated fatigue damage.

The resulting bulk behavior of solder is described as viscoplastic (i.e. rate dependent inelastic deformation) with sensitivity to elevated temperatures. Most solders experience temperature exposures near their melting temperature (high homologous temperature) throughout their operational lifetime which makes them susceptible to significant creep. Several constitutive models have been developed to capture the creep characteristics of lead and lead-free solders. Creep behavior can be described in three stages: primary, secondary, and tertiary creep. When modeling solder, secondary creep, also called steady state creep (constant strain rate), is often the region of interest for describing solder behavior in electronics. Some models also incorporate primary creep. Two of the most popular models are hyperbolic sine models developed by Garofalo and Anand to characterize the steady state creep of solder. These model parameters are often incorporated as inputs in FEA simulations to properly characterize the solder response to loading.

== Fatigue models ==
Solder damage models take a physics-of-failure based approach by relating a physical parameter that is a critical measure of the damage mechanism process (i.e. inelastic strain range or dissipated strain energy density) to cycles to failure. The relationship between the physical parameter and cycles to failure typically takes on a power law or modified power law relationship with material dependent model constants. These model constants are fit from experimental testing and simulation for different solder alloys. For complex loading schemes, Miner's linear superposition damage law is employed to calculate accumulated damage.

=== Coffin–Manson model ===
The generalized Coffin–Manson model considers the elastic and plastic strain range by incorporating Basquin's equation and takes the form: $\frac{\Delta\epsilon}{2}=\frac{\sigma^'_f-\sigma_m}{E} (2N_f)^b+\epsilon^'_f (2N_f)^c$

Here ∆ε / 2 represents the elastic-plastic cyclic strain range, E represents elastic modulus, σ_{m} represents means stress, and N_{f} represents cycles to failure. The remaining variables, namely σ_{f},ε'_{f},b, and c are fatigue coefficients and exponents representing material model constants. The generalized Coffin–Manson model accounts for the effects of high cycle fatigue (HCF) primarily due to elastic deformation and low cycle fatigue (LCF) primarily due to plastic deformation.

=== Engelmaier model ===
In the 1980s Engelmaier proposed a model, in conjunction with the work of Wild, that accounted for some of the limitations of the Coffin–Manson model, such as the effects of the frequency and temperature. His model takes a similar power law form: $N_f(50\%)=\frac{1}{2} (\frac{\Delta\gamma}{2 \epsilon'_f})^{\frac{1}{c}}$

$c=-0.442-6\cdot 10^{-4}T_s+1.74\cdot 10^{-2} \ln (1+f)$

Engelmaier relates the total shear strain (∆γ) to cycles to failure (N_{f}). ε'_{f} and c are model constants where c is a function of mean temperature during thermal cycling (T_{s}) and thermal cycling frequency (f). $\Delta \gamma= C ( \frac{L_D}{h_s}) \Delta \alpha \Delta T$

∆γ can be calculated as function of the distance from the neutral point (L_{D}) solder joint height (h_{s}), coefficient of thermal expansion (∆α), and change in temperature (ΔT). In this case C is empirical model constant.

This model was initially proposed for leadless devices with tin-lead solder. The model has since been modified by Engelmaier and others to account for other phenomena such as leaded components, thermal cycling dwell times, and lead-free solders. While initially a substantial improvement over other techniques to predict solder fatigue, such as testing and simple acceleration transforms, it is now generally acknowledged that Engelmaier and other models that are based on strain range do not provide a sufficient degree of accuracy.

=== Darveaux model ===
Darveaux proposed a model relating the quantity of volume weighted average inelastic work density, the number of cycles to crack initiation, and the crack propagation rate to the characteristic cycles to failure. $N_0=K_1\Delta W^{K_2}_{avg}$

$\frac{da}{dN}=K_3\Delta W^{K_4}_{avg}$

$N_f=N_0+\frac{a}{da/dN}=K_1\Delta W^{K_2}_{avg}+\frac{a}{K_3 \Delta W^{K_4}_{avg}}$

In the first equation N_{0} represents the number of cycles to crack initiation, ∆W represents inelastic work density, K_{1} and K_{2} are material model constants. In the second equation, da/dN represents the crack prorogation rate, ∆W represents inelastic work density, K_{3} and K_{4} are material model constants. In this case the crack propagation rate is approximated to be constant. N_{f} represents the characteristic cycles to failure and a represents the characteristic crack length. Model constants can be fit for different solder alloys using a combination of experimental testing and finite element analysis (FEA) simulation.

The Darveaux model has been found to be relatively accurate by several authors. However, due to the expertise, complexity, and simulation resources required, its use has been primarily limited to component manufacturers evaluating component packaging. The model has not received acceptance in regards to modeling solder fatigue across an entire printed circuit assembly and has been found to be inaccurate in predicting system-level effects (triaxiality) on solder fatigue.

=== Blattau model ===
The current solder joint fatigue model preferred by the majority of electronic OEMs worldwide is the Blattau model, which is available in the Sherlock Automated Design Analysis software. The Blattau model is an evolution of the previous models discussed above. Blattau incorporates the use of strain energy proposed by Darveaux, while using closed-form equations based on classic mechanics to calculate the stress and strain being applied to the solder interconnect. An example of these stress/strain calculations for a simple leadless chip component is shown in the following equation: $(\alpha_1-\alpha_2)\cdot \Delta T \cdot L_D=F \cdot ( \frac{L_D}{E_1 A_1}+ \frac{L_D}{E_2 A_2}+\frac{h_S}{A_s G_s}+\frac{h_c}{A_c G_c}+(\frac{2-\nu}{9G_b a}))$

Here α is the CTE, T is temperature, L_{D} is the distance to the neutral point, E is elastic modulus, A is the area, h is the thickness, G is shear modulus, ν is Poisson's ratio, and a is the edge length of the copper bond pad. The subscripts 1 refer to the component, 2 and b refer to the board, and s refer to the solder joint. The shear stress (∆τ) is then calculated by dividing this calculated force by the effective solder joint area. Strain energy is computed using the shear strain range and shear stress from the following relationship:

$\Delta W= \frac{1}{2}\Delta \gamma \Delta \tau$

This approximates the hysteresis loop to be roughly equilateral in shape. Blattau uses this strain energy value in conjunction with models developed by Syed to relate dissipated strain energy to cycles to failure.

=== Other fatigue models ===
The Norris–Landzberg model is a modified Coffin–Manson model.

Additional strain range and strain energy based models have been proposed by several others.

== Vibration and cyclic mechanical fatigue ==
While not as prevalent as thermomechanical solder fatigue, vibration fatigue and cyclic mechanical fatigue are also known to cause solder failures. Vibration fatigue is typically considered to be high cycle fatigue (HCF) with damage driven by elastic deformation and sometimes plastic deformation. This can depend on the input excitation for both harmonic and random vibration. Steinberg developed a vibration model to predict time to failure based on the calculated board displacement. This model takes into account the input vibration profile such as the power spectral density or acceleration time history, the natural frequency of the circuit card, and the transmissibility. Blattau developed a modified Steinberg model that uses board level strains rather than displacement and has sensitivity to individual package types.

Additionally, low-temperature isothermal mechanical cycling is typically modeled with a combination of LCF and HCF strain range or strain energy models. The solder alloy, assembly geometry and materials, boundary conditions, and loading conditions will affect whether fatigue damage is dominated by elastic (HCF) or plastic (LCF) damage. At lower temperatures and faster strain rates the creep can approximated to be minimal and any inelastic damage will be dominated by plasticity. Several strain range and strain energy models have been employed in this type of a case, such as the Generalized Coffin–Manson model. In this case, much work has been done to characterize the model constants of various damage models for different alloys.

== See also ==
- Cold solder joint
- Creep (deformation)
- Fatigue (material)
- Plasticity (physics)
- Poor metal
- Potting (electronics)
- Vibration fatigue
