= Feedback-controlled electromigration =

Electronic experimental technique

Feedback-controlled electromigration (FCE) is an experimental technique to investigate the phenomenon known as electromigration. By controlling the voltage applied as the conductance varies it is possible to keep the voltage at a critical level for electromigration.

== Theory ==
FCE has been shown to be reversible, demonstrating the fact that the electrons are moving rather than thermomigration or sublimation. The migration occurs due to the electronic wind force experienced by the metallic adatom. The electromigration occurs at a critical power dissipation $P=I/G$ in the neck of the bridge. This leads to Electromigrated Nanogaps which hold immense potential for sensing applications, exploiting the quantum tunneling effect.

== Uses ==
FCE is often used in forming nanogaps in metallic bridges.

== Problems ==
Thermal runaway can occur when the neck is narrower than about 20 nm.
