= Gate dielectric =

Field-effect transistor

A gate dielectric is a dielectric used between the gate and substrate of a field-effect transistor (such as a MOSFET). In state-of-the-art processes, the gate dielectric is subject to many constraints, including:

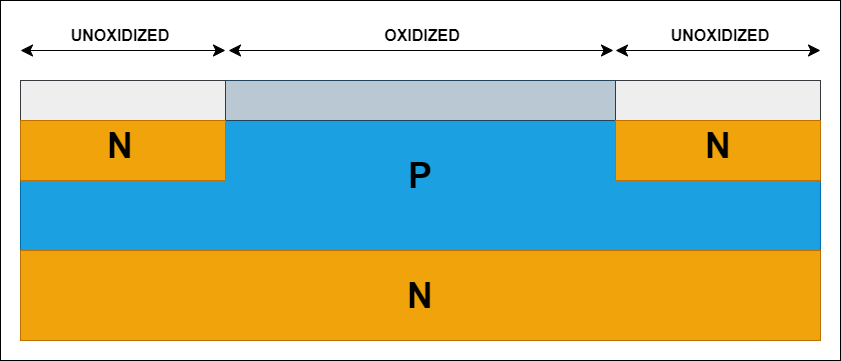
Diagram of silicon dioxide gate dielectric transistor made by Frosch and Derrick in 1957

- Electrically clean interface to the substrate (low density of quantum states for electrons)
- High capacitance, to increase the FET transconductance
- High thickness, to avoid dielectric breakdown and leakage by quantum tunneling.

The capacitance and thickness constraints are almost directly opposed to each other. For silicon-substrate FETs, the gate dielectric is almost always silicon dioxide (called "gate oxide"), since thermal oxide has a very clean interface. However, the semiconductor industry is interested in finding alternative materials with higher dielectric constants, which would allow higher capacitance with the same thickness.

== History ==
In 1955, Carl Frosch and Lincoln Derrick accidentally grew a layer of silicon dioxide over the silicon wafer, for which they observed surface passivation effects. By 1957 Frosch and Derrick, using masking and predeposition, were able to manufacture silicon dioxide transistors and showed that silicon dioxide insulated, protected silicon wafers and prevented dopants from diffusing into the wafer. Silicon dioxide remains the standard gate dielectric in MOSFET technology.

== See also ==
- QBD (electronics)
- Gate oxide
