= Time-dependent gate oxide breakdown =

Failure mechanism in MOSFETs

Time-dependent gate oxide breakdown (or time-dependent dielectric breakdown, TDDB) is a kind of transistor aging, a failure mechanism in MOSFETs, when the gate oxide breaks down as a result of long-time application of relatively low electric field (as opposed to immediate breakdown, which is caused by strong electric field). The breakdown is caused by formation of a conducting path through the gate oxide to substrate due to electron tunneling current, when MOSFETs are operated close to or beyond their specified operating voltages.

== Models ==
The defect generation in the dielectric is a stochastic process. There are two modes of breakdown, intrinsic and extrinsic. Intrinsic breakdown is caused by electrical stress induced defect generation. Extrinsic breakdown is caused by defects induced by the manufacturing process. For Integrated circuits, the time to breakdown is dependent on the thickness of the dielectric (gate oxide) and also on the material type, which is dependent on the manufacturing process node. Older generation products with gate oxide thickness > 4 nm are based on SiO2 and the advanced process nodes with gate oxide < 4 nm are based on high-k dielectric materials. There are different breakdown models and thickness of the gate oxide determines the validity of the model. E model, 1/E model and power law exponential model are common models which depict the breakdown behavior.

The failure types for integrated circuit (IC) components follow the classic bath tub curve. There is infant mortality, which is decreasing failure rate typically due to manufacturing defects. A low constant failure rate which is random in nature. Wear out failures are increasing failures due to aging semiconductor degradation mechanisms. TDDB is one of the intrinsic wear out failure mechanisms. Performance of the IC components can be evaluated for semiconductor wear out mechanisms including TDDB for any given operating conditions. The breakdown models mentioned above could be used to predict the time to fail for the component due to time dependent dielectric breakdown (TDDB).

== Test method ==
The most commonly used test for the investigation of TDDB behavior is "constant stress". Constant stress tests can be applied in form of constant voltage stress (CVS) or constant current stress. In the former, a voltage (that is often lower than the breakdown voltage of the oxide) is applied to the gate, while its leakage current is being monitored. The time it will take for the oxide to break under this constant applied voltage is called the time-to-failure. The test is then repeated several times to obtain a distribution of time-to-failure. These distributions are used to create reliability plots and to predict the TDDB behavior of oxide at other voltages.

== See also ==
- QBD
- High-temperature operating life
