= QBD (electronics) =

Test of MOS devices

QBD is the term applied to the charge-to-breakdown measurement of a semiconductor device. It is a standard destructive test method used to determine the quality of gate oxides in MOS devices. It is equal to the total charge passing through the dielectric layer (i.e. electron or hole fluence multiplied by the elementary charge) just before failure. Thus QBD is a measure of time-dependent gate oxide breakdown. As a measure of oxide quality, QBD can also be a useful predictor of product reliability under specified electrical stress conditions.

== Test method ==
Voltage is applied to the MOS structure to force a controlled current through the oxide, i.e. to inject a controlled amount of charge into the dielectric layer. By measuring the time after which the measured voltage drops towards zero (when electrical breakdown occurs) and integrating the injected current over time, the charge needed to break the gate oxide is determined.

This gate charge integral is defined as:
$$Q_\text{bd} = \int_{0}^{t_\text{bd}} i(t)\, dt$$
where $t_\text{bd}$ is the measurement time at the step just prior to destructive avalanche breakdown.

=== Variants ===
There are five common variants of the QBD test method:

1. Linear voltage ramp (V-ramp test procedure involving the current-voltage characteristic curve (I–V curve) using a linearly increasing and/or decreasing voltage as in a sawtooth wave or triangle wave)
2. Constant current stress (CCS)
3. Exponential current ramp (ECR) (involving the I–V curve using an exponentially increasing and/or decreasing voltage as in a RC time constant charging/discharging-based waveform) or (J-ramp test procedure)
4. Bounded J-ramp (a variant of the J-ramp procedure, in which the current ramp stops at a defined stress level, and continues as a constant current stress).
5. Linear current ramp (LCR) (involving the I–V curve using a linearly increasing and/or decreasing current as in a sawtooth wave or triangle wave)

For the V-ramp test procedure, the measured current is integrated to obtain QBD. The measured current is also used as a detection criterion for terminating the voltage ramp. One of the defined criteria is the change of logarithmic current slope between successive voltage steps.

=== Analysis ===
The cumulative distribution of measured QBD is commonly analysed using a Weibull chart.

== Standards ==
=== JEDEC standard ===
- JESD35-A – Procedure for the Wafer-Level Testing of Thin Dielectrics, April 2001

== See also ==
- Capacitor § Breakdown voltage
- Field electron emission
