= Negative-bias temperature instability =

Key reliability issue in MOSFETs

Negative-bias temperature instability (NBTI) is a key reliability issue in MOSFETs, a type of transistor aging. NBTI manifests as an increase in the threshold voltage and consequent decrease in drain current and transconductance of a MOSFET. The degradation is often approximated by a power-law dependence on time. It is of immediate concern in p-channel MOS devices (pMOS), since they almost always operate with negative gate-to-source voltage; however, the very same mechanism also affects nMOS transistors when biased in the accumulation region, i.e. with a negative bias applied to the gate.

More specifically, over time positive charges become trapped at the oxide-semiconductor boundary underneath the gate of a MOSFET. These positive charges partially cancel the negative gate voltage without contributing to conduction through the channel as electron holes in the semiconductor are supposed to. When the gate voltage is removed, the trapped charges dissipate over a time scale of milliseconds to hours. The problem has become more acute as transistors have shrunk, as there is less averaging of the effect over a large gate area. Thus, different transistors experience different amounts of NBTI, defeating standard circuit design techniques for tolerating manufacturing variability which depend on the close matching of adjacent transistors.

NBTI has become significant for portable electronics because it interacts badly with two common power-saving techniques: reduced operating voltages and clock gating. With lower operating voltages, the NBTI-induced threshold voltage change is a larger fraction of the logic voltage and has a higher potential to disrupts operations. When a clock is gated off, transistors stop switching and NBTI effects accumulate much more rapidly. When the clock is re-enabled, the transistor thresholds have changed and the circuit may not operate. Some low-power designs switch to a low-frequency clock rather than stopping completely in order to mitigate NBTI effects.

There is also a positive bias temperature instability (PBTI) which affects a nMOS transistor when positively biased. It has become more important with the introduction of high κ metal gates.

== Physics ==
The details of the mechanisms of NBTI have been debated, but two effects are believed to contribute: trapping of positively charged holes, and generation of interface states.

- preexisting traps located in the bulk of the dielectric are filled with holes coming from the channel of pMOS. Those traps can be emptied when the stress voltage is removed, so that the Vth degradation can be recovered over time.
- interface traps are generated, and these interface states become positively charged when the pMOS device is biased in the "on" state, i.e. with negative gate voltage. Some interface states may become deactivated when the stress is removed, so that the Vth degradation can be recovered over time.

The existence of two coexisting mechanisms has resulted in scientific controversy over the relative importance of each component, and over the mechanism of generation and recovery of interface states.

In sub-micrometer devices nitrogen is incorporated into the silicon gate oxide to reduce the gate leakage current density and prevent boron penetration. It is known that incorporating nitrogen enhances NBTI. For new technologies (45 nm and shorter nominal channel lengths), high-κ metal gate stacks are used as an alternative to improve the gate current density for a given equivalent oxide thickness (EOT). Even with the introduction of new materials like hafnium oxide in the gate stack, NBTI remains and is often exacerbated by additional charge trapping in the high-κ layer.

In the case of PBTI, no interface states are generated and 100% of the Vth degradation may be recovered.

== Modeling approaches ==
NBTI modeling approaches can be broadly classified as empirical or physics-based.

The empirical power-law model is widely used due to its simplicity and simulation efficiency. It approximates the threshold voltage shift as:

$$\Delta V_\text{th}(t) = A \cdot t^n$$

where $A$ is a prefactor influenced by electric field, oxide thickness, temperature, and process variation, and $n$ is the time exponent. While useful for estimating long-term aging trends, this model lacks physical insight into trap generation and does not account for recovery.

The reaction–diffusion (RD) model is more computationally intensive but provides improved accuracy and predictive capabilities, especially in advanced nodes and for time-dependent recovery. This more physically accurate model describes two interlinked processes as per

=== Reaction phase ===
Under negative bias and elevated temperature, a chemical reaction at the Si/SiO₂ interface breaks Si–H bonds, generating interface traps and releasing hydrogen:

$\text{Si–H} \rightleftharpoons \text{Si}^+ + X_{\text{interface}}$ (1)

The forward rate constant $k_f$ governs the rate of trap generation.

=== Diffusion phase ===
The freed hydrogen diffuses away into the oxide bulk, reducing the local hydrogen concentration and triggering further Si–H dissociation. Upon stress removal, some hydrogen returns to re-passivate the traps:

$X_{\text{interface}} \rightleftharpoons X_{\text{bulk}}$ (2)

This reversible diffusion explains the partial recovery observed in NBTI. The reverse process is controlled by a trap annealing rate constant $k_r$.

The time evolution of interface trap density $N_{it}(t)$ is modeled by the following rate equation:

$\frac{\partial N_{it}(t)}{\partial t} = k_f (N_0 - N_{it}(t)) - k_r N_{it}(t) \cdot N_X(0,t)^{1/a}$ (3)

Where:

- $N_0$ – Initial number of Si–H bonds
- $N_X(0,t)$ – Surface concentration of hydrogen at interface
- $a$ – Reaction order (typically 1 or 2)
- $k_f$ – Forward rate constant
- $k_r$ – Reverse rate constant

Modern TCAD (Technology Computer-Aided Design) frameworks, implement extended versions of these models, enabling accurate simulation of degradation caused by NBTI.

=== Other models ===
The RD model has proven insufficient to explain fast changes captured in fast BTI measurements. The trapping/detrapping (TD) model has been validated against silicon for this purpose. Models that combine RD and TD show that "the most dominant component of BTI is due to hole trapping and interface trap generation".

== Circuit-level effects ==
NBTI increases the threshold voltage of pMOS transistors over time, reducing their drive strength. In digital logic circuits, this leads to increased propagation delays and timing degradation. These changes can accumulate across logic paths, impacting setup and hold margins. BTI affects sequential and combinational circuits quite differently and the degradation varies to 5X in between operating conditions.

Some timing margins can be made in the chip design so that the chip can cope with the more sluggish reaction times of BTI-damaged transistors at a cost of peak performance. A chip can also reduce its performance over its lifespan gradually to compensate for BTI effects, using an internal count of hours used or active sensing of the degree of BTI damage.

== Stress and recovery ==
NBTI degradation consists of a stress phase and a recovery phase. During stress, Si–H bonds at the interface break under negative gate bias and elevated temperature, generating interface traps. When stress is removed, some of the hydrogen species diffuse back and re-passivate the broken bonds, leading to partial recovery. The recovery is typically incomplete and strongly dependent on device type, temperature, and stress duration. PMOS (NBTI) transistors tend to show slower and less reversible recovery than NMOS (PBTI) due to differences in hydrogen diffusivity and interface chemistry.

A number of power-saving techniques, especially power gating, can be adapted to reduce the time a transistor spends under stress, leaving more time for passive recovery to happen.

There has been some research into actively causing or accelerating BTI recovery. By applying a small reverse voltage across the PMOS, the hydrogen can be actively driven back into their original positions. A higher temperature of the chip also accelerates recovery. With both a small reverse voltage (-0.3 V) and an elevated temperature, it is possible to restore several hours worth of BTI degradation in one hour.

== In advanced nodes ==
As technology scales below 14 nm, NBTI remains a critical reliability concern. FinFETs show increased NBTI degradation due to higher vertical electric fields and localized self-heating, which accelerates trap generation. Studies show degradation up to 25% in 7 nm FinFETs due to NBTI and Hot Carrier Injection (HCI) effects.

Gate-All-Around FETs (GAAFETs) offer improved recovery characteristics compared to FinFETs due to more symmetric hydrogen diffusion and re-passivation. Devices with 100 oriented channels in particular show ~20% lower NBTI degradation under identical stress conditions.

== Security implications ==
NBTI has been exploited in hardware security attacks, particularly in cloud-deployed FPGAs. The "pentimento" effect refers to data remanence caused by BTI-induced changes in delay characteristics of LUTs, which can allow adversaries to reconstruct previously programmed values.

Additionally, NBTI can be used to trigger hardware Trojans or fault injection attacks by inducing accelerated degradation on specific logic paths. Attackers can exploit stress patterns or aging-aware layouts to control circuit behavior over time.

== See also ==
- Hot carrier injection
- Electromigration
