= Stress migration =

Stress migration is a failure mechanism that often occurs in integrated circuit metallization (aluminum, copper). Voids form as result of vacancy migration driven by the hydrostatic stress gradient. Large voids may lead to open circuit or unacceptable resistance increase that impedes the IC performance. 'Stress migration is often referred as stress voiding, stress induced voiding or SIV.

High temperature processing of copper dual damascene structures leaves the copper with a large tensile stress due to a mismatch in coefficient of thermal expansion of the materials involved. The stress can relax with time through the diffusion of vacancies leading to the formation of voids and ultimately open circuit failures.
