= Gummel =

Gummel may refer to:

In people:

- Margitta Gummel (1941–2021), an athlete from East Germany
- Hermann Gummel (1923–2022), a German-born physicist and pioneer in semiconductor industry

In other uses:

- Gumel, or Gummel, a town and traditional emirate in Jigawa State, Nigeria
- Gummel–Poon model, a model of the bipolar junction transistor
- Gummel plot, transistor plot
