= MASTAR MOSFET Model =

The MASTAR (Model for Analog Simulation of subThreshold, saturation and weak Avalanche Regions) is an analytical model of Metal-Oxide Semiconductor Field-Effect Transistors, developed using the voltage-doping transformation (VDT) technique. MASTAR offers good accuracy and continuity in current and its derivatives in all operation regimes of the MOSFET devices. The model has been successfully used in CAD/EDA simulation tools.

The official ITRS definition of the acronym MASTAR is Model for Assessment of CMOS Technologies And Roadmaps. This software is developed by STMicroelectronics and is freely distributed on ITRS organization web site.

== See also ==
- Transistor models
- SPICE
