= Circuit design language =

Type of netlist

A circuit design language (CDL) is a kind of netlist, a description of an electronic circuit. It is usually automatically generated from a circuit schematic. It is used for electronic circuit simulation and layout versus schematic (LVS) checks. It is similar to SPICE netlists, but with some extensions.

Several vendors such as Cadence Design Systems, Mentor Graphics, and Synopsys support CDL netlists, although their solutions may be proprietary and not readable by competing systems.
