= Laurence W. Nagel =

American electrical engineer

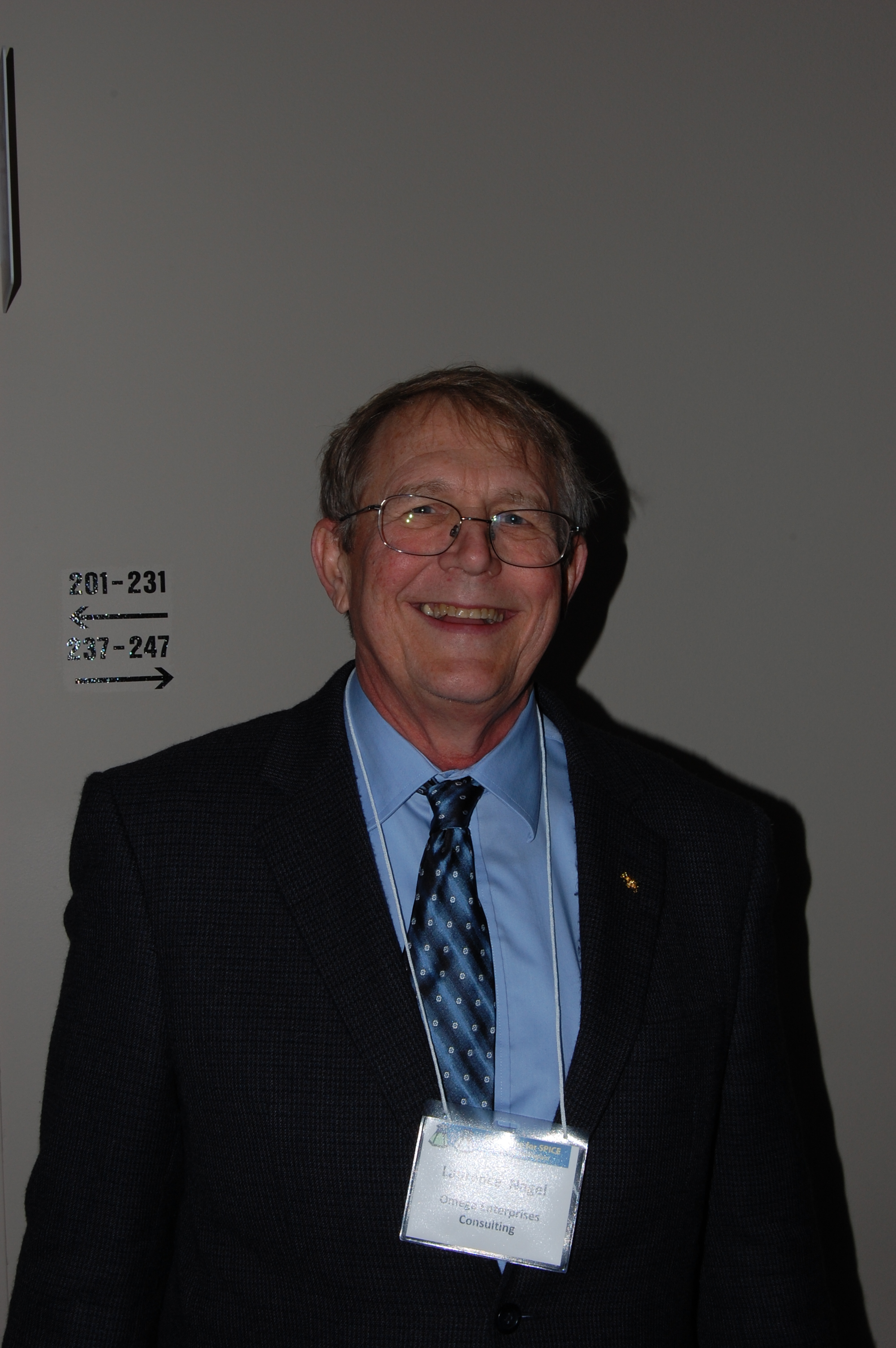
- Laurence W. Nagel
- Born: 1946 (age 79–80)
- Education: University of California, Berkeley
- Occupation: Electrical Engineer
- Scientific career
- Fields: Electrical Engineering

Laurence W. Nagel (born 1946) is an American electrical engineer and industry consultant. He is best known for being the inventor of the SPICE circuit simulator.

== Biography ==
He was born in 1946.

He is married to Jean Gleason and resides in California.

== Education ==
He attended the University of California, Berkeley where he completed his BS, MS, and PhD degrees in EECS in 1969, 1970, and 1975, respectively.

His PhD dissertation involved developing the SPICE program. His doctoral dissertation supervisor was Donald Pederson. His major collaborator was Ronald A. Rohrer, another American computer scientist.

== Career ==
In 1998, he founded his own company called Omega Enterprises Consulting. He is currently working as an independent consultant in San Francisco. He provides expert advice to his clients and customers in the fields of Analog circuit design, Computer-aided design, circuit simulation, semiconductor device modeling.

== Awards and Honours ==
SPICE was recognized as an IEEE Milestone in 2011.

He has received the IEEE Donald O. Pederson Award in Solid-State Circuits.

== See also ==
- University of California, Berkeley
- Electronic circuit simulation
