= Hermann Gummel =

German electronics engineer (1923–2022)

- Born: Hermann Karl Gummel; 5 July 1923; Hanover, Hanover, Prussia, Germany
- Died: 5 September 2022 (aged 99); New Jersey, United States
- Education: Philipps University; Syracuse University
- Known for: Gummel–Poon model
- Awards: David Sarnoff Award (1983); National Academy of Engineering (1985); Phil Kaufman Award (1994)
- Scientific career
- Fields: Semiconductor devices
- Workplaces: Bell Laboratories
- Doctoral advisor: Melvin Lax

Hermann K. Gummel (6 July 1923 – 5 September 2022) was a German physicist and pioneer in the semiconductor industry.

The son of Hans and Charlotte Gummel, he was the middle of their three children, Bärbel and Achi being respectively his older sister and his younger brother. Grown up in very turbulent times in Nazi Germany, after graduating from high school, he was enlisted as a radio operator for the Germany Army in World War II. As a soldier, he was wounded by shrapnel and taken prisoner during the D Day. After being brought to Scotland as a war prisoner, the compassionate care of the doctors and medical staff avoided his leg amputation: he was always grateful for this, though he suffered pain in his leg for the rest of his life.

Gummel received his Diplom degree in physics from Philipps University (Marburg, Germany) in 1952. He received his M.S. (1952) and Ph.D. (1957) degrees in theoretical semiconductor physics from Syracuse University. In Marburg met and fall in love with Erika Reich, who eventually become his wife. Gummel joined Bell Laboratories in 1956; his doctoral advisor, Melvin Lax, had moved from Syracuse University to Bell the previous year.

At Bell, Gummel made important contributions to the design and simulation of the semiconductor devices used throughout modern electronics. Among the most important of his contributions are the Gummel–Poon model which made accurate simulation of bipolar transistors possible and which was central to the development of the SPICE program; Gummel's method, used to solve the equations for the detailed behavior of individual bipolar transistors; and the Gummel plot, used to characterize bipolar transistors. Gummel also created one of the first personal workstations, based on HP minicomputers and Tektronix terminals and used for VLSI design and layout, and MOTIS, the first MOS timing simulator and the basis of "fast SPICE" programs.

In 1983, Gummel received the David Sarnoff Award "for contributions and leadership in device analysis and development of computer-aided design tools for semiconductor devices and circuits". In 1985, Gummel was elected to the United States National Academy of Engineering for "contributions and leadership in the analysis and computer-aided design of semiconductor devices and circuits.". In 1994, he was the first recipient of Phil Kaufman Award.

Gummel died on 5 September 2022, at the age of 99.

== See also ==
- Gummel plot
- Gummel–Poon model

== Selected bibliography ==
- Gummel, Hermann; Lax, Melvin (1957). "Thermal capture of electrons in silicon". Annals of Physics. 2 (1): 28–56. Bibcode:1957AnPhy...2...28G. doi:10.1016/0003-4916(57)90034-9.
- Gummel, H. K.; Poon, H. C. (May 1970). "An integral charge control model of bipolar transistors". Bell Syst. Tech. J. 49 (5): 827–852. doi:10.1002/j.1538-7305.1970.tb01803.x.
- Gummel, H. K.; Chawla, Basant R.; Kozak, Paul (December 1975). "MOTIS-An MOS Timing Simulator". IEEE Transactions on Circuits and Systems. CAS-22 (12): 901–910. doi:10.1109/TCS.1975.1084003.
