= Safe area =

Safe area may refer to:

- Safe area (television), areas of TV picture that can be seen on screens
- Safe area (Bosnian War), areas of Bosnia and Herzegovina under United Nations peacekeeper watch

== See also ==
- Safe operating area
