= PowerEsim =

PowerEsim is an electronic circuit simulation software for online switched-mode power supply (SMPS) and transformer design. It can carry out loss analysis at component and circuit level, simulation of board temperature, design verification, failure rate analysis and generate relevant reports.

One of the common circuit design simulation tool used is a SPICE simulator. This knowledge-oriented design approach tool requires a user to possess knowledge about it and about the module being simulated. Within a different kind of simulation, transformer design and simulation requires considerable knowledge of the physical concepts, although a transformer is just wires around a magnetic core.

To evaluate the feasibility of a user simulating a circuit without domain knowledge, PowerEsim was developed as a result-oriented approach simulation tool only requiring the BOM (Bill of Materials) and the topology used to perform the simulation.

PowerEsim also handles differential equations by using closed-form equations instead of numerical methods. Some approximations have been made to speed up calculation, leading to a steady-state simulation in PowerEsim claimed to take less than 0.1 second, 1,000 times faster than SPICE simulation. PowerEsim model components are available in the market.
