= CoolSPICE =

Computer aided design tool for electronic circuit development

- Stable release: ver5.2.1029.1122 / 2015
- Platform: Windows
- Available in: English
- Type: Electronic circuit simulation
- License: GNU Lesser General Public License 2.1
- Website: coolcadelectronics.com

CoolSPICE is a computer-aided design (CAD) tool developed by CoolCAD Electronics Inc. It is a specialized version of the SPICE (Simulation Program with Integrated Circuit Emphasis) simulation tool, designed for the analysis and simulation of circuit operation at cryogenic temperatures, circuits using wide-bandgap semiconductors, and the impact of thermal effects on circuit performance.

== Overview ==
CoolSPICE originated from SPICE3f5 and is based on the Ngspice simulator. Developed by CoolCAD Electronics, Inc., it offers simulation capabilities for standard electronic applications, including radio frequency and audio circuits, but focuses on simulating circuits designed to operate at extreme temperatures, particularly in the range of 4° to 300° Kelvin. It supports the modeling of both cryogenic-temperature CMOS circuits and high-power silicon carbide (SiC)-based devices like MOSFETs. In addition, the tool can simulate the effects of temperature changes due to power dissipation during circuit operation.

CoolSPICE is particularly suited for industries and research environments that require detailed analysis of circuits operating in extreme conditions. This includes applications in cryogenic electronics, high-power semiconductor devices, and environments with significant thermal variability.
