= Derating =

Concept in electronics

In electronics, derating is the operation of a device at less than its rated maximum capability to prolong its life. Typical examples include operations below the maximum power rating, current rating, or voltage rating.

== In electronics ==
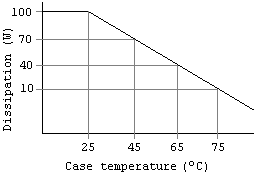
Derating curve of a hypothetical power device.

Power semiconductor devices have a maximum power dissipation rating usually quoted at a case temperature of 25 °C (77 °F). The datasheet for the device also includes a derating curve which indicates how much a device will dissipate without getting damaged at any given case temperature, and this must be taken into account while designing a system.

As can be seen from the derating curve image for a hypothetical bipolar junction transistor, the device (rated for 100 W at 25 °C (77 °F)) cannot be expected to dissipate anything more than about 40 W if the ambient temperature is such that the temperature at which the device's case will stabilize (after heat-sinking) is 65 °C (149 °F). This final case temperature is a function of the thermal resistance between the device's case and the heat-sink; and the heat-sink and the ambient (this includes the heat-sinks temp/watt rating - with lower values implying better cooling characteristics).

Some capacitors' voltage capability is reduced at higher temperatures because the softened dielectric (e.g., a polymer) is softened further by the heat, and its breakdown field strength is reduced. Derating curves are included in data sheets for such capacitors.

Derating can also provide a safety margin for transient voltages or currents (spikes) that exceed normal operation or prolong life. For example, the life of electrolytic capacitors is dramatically increased by operating them below their maximum temperature rating.

== In electrical installations ==
All dimmers rely on heat conduction and convection to keep the electronic components cool. Similarly, power wiring (e.g., house wiring) not surrounded by an air space (e.g., inside a conduit) needs to have its current-limiting device (e.g., circuit breaker or fuse) adjusted so as not to carry as much current through that circuit. Derating is the reduction of the maximum capacity (load) a unit can reliably handle when fins/side sections are removed.

== See also ==
- Safe operating area
- Underclocking
