= Current injection technique =

The current injection technique is a technique developed to reduce the turn-OFF switching transient of power bipolar semiconductor devices. It was developed and published by Dr S. Eio of Staffordshire University (United Kingdom) in 2007.

== Background ==
The Turn-OFF switching transient of silicon-based power bipolar semiconductor devices, caused by stored charge in the device during the forward conduction state, limits switching speed of the device, which in turn limits the efficiency of the application it is used within.

Different techniques, such as carrier lifetime control, injection efficiency and buffer layer devices, have been used to minimize turn-OFF switching transient, but all result in a trade-off between the ON-state loss and switching speed.

== Details of the Technique ==
The current injection technique examined in Dr Eio's publications optimize the switching transient of power diodes, thyristors and insulated gate bipolar transistors (IGBTs) without the need of changing the structure of these devices. To implement the current injection technique, current injection circuit was developed with results indicating that the injection of an additional current during its switching transient can reduce the reverse recovery charge of a given power diode and thyristor, and also reduce the tail current of insulated gate bipolar transistors.

Practical experimental results on diodes and thyristors showed that the amplitude of the injected current required is proportional to the peak reverse recovery current and proved that these devices experience a momentary increase in recombination of current carriers during the injection of the additional current. This help to prevent the device from conducting large negative current, which in turn reduce its reverse recovery charge and reverse recovery time. Results obtained from experiments with insulated gate bipolar transistors showed a significant reduction in the time where current falls to zero when opposing current was injected into the device during its turn-off transient. Further simulation results from numerical modeling showed that the injected opposing current temporary increase recombination in the device and therefore reduce the extracted excess carriers that stored within the device.

To prevent circuit commutation and bonding between the current injection circuit and the main test circuit where the device under test (DUT) is connected to, non-invasive circuit was developed to magnetically couple the two circuits.

In summary, current injection technique makes it possible to use devices with low forward voltage drop for high frequency applications. This also imply cheaper cost of devices as less processing steps are required during the manufacturing stages where the need of carrier lifetime control techniques are reduced. This removed the need for the semiconductor device used in the current injection circuit to have high breakdown voltage rating and also provided electrical isolation. Typical application of this technique in an inductive load chopper circuit showed a significant reduction in the tail current of insulated gate bipolar transistors, and the reverse recovery time and charge of the freewheeling diode used.
