= IBIS Interconnect Modeling Specification =

The IBIS Interconnect Modeling Specification (ICM) in electronic circuit simulation is a behavioral, ASCII-based file format. The ICM is used for distributing passive interconnect modeling information. The format and style of ICM are highly similar to the Input Output Buffer Information Specification (IBIS), and both specifications are managed by the same organization, the IBIS Open Forum.

Interconnects under ICM may be represented through tabular frequency-dependent RLGC matrices or through S-parameters in separate Touchstone files. ICM models define interconnects as consisting of one or more segments. Segment topologies are described in terms of the arrangements of their nodes relative to pin or port lists. The electrical behaviors for each segment are then defined. Interconnects may be grouped into families with similar characteristics or sharing identical segment definitions.

As of 2006, ICM version 1.1 has been standardized in the US through both the GEIA and ANSI as ANSI GEIA-STD-0001.
