= Plexim =

Software company

- Company type: Private
- Industry: Mathematical Computing Software
- Founded: June 1, 2002; 23 years ago
- Headquarters: Zurich, Switzerland
- Area served: Worldwide
- Key people: Jost Allmeling; (CEO); Wolfgang Hammer; (CTO)
- Products: PLECS
- Website: www.plexim.com

Plexim GmbH is a software company that develops modeling and simulation tools for power electronic systems. The company is known for its main product, PLECS (Piecewise Linear Electrical Circuit Simulation), which is used in the design and analysis of power converters, electrical drives, and control systems.

Plexim is located in Zurich and Boston and has local representatives worldwide.

== History ==
Plexim was founded in 2002 as a spin-off from the Power Systems Laboratory at the Swiss Federal Institute of Technology (ETH Zurich) in Zurich, Switzerland. It was first associated with the Power Systems Laboratory at the Department of Information Technology and Electrical Engineering. It then moved its offices to Technopark Zürich. The company was established to commercialize simulation technology developed during academic research, aimed at improving the modeling efficiency of switched electrical systems.

Over time, Plexim expanded its operations beyond Europe, establishing offices and partner networks in North America and Asia to support a global customer base.

In April 2009, Plexim opened an office in Cambridge, Massachusetts.

== Products ==
=== PLECS ===
The company's main product, PLECS, is a simulation platform for system-level design of power electronics. It enables the modeling of electrical circuits, control loops, thermal behavior, and other physical domains within a unified environment.

PLECS is available in two editions:

- PLECS Blockset which integrates with MATLAB®/Simulink®.
- PLECS Standalone a standalone simulation environment optimized for performance and ease of use.

== Industry and Academic Use ==
PLECS is widely used in academic research and engineering education due to its ability to represent complex multi-domain systems. The software has also been referenced in numerous peer-reviewed journal articles and technical conference papers focused on power electronics simulation.
