= Melvin Lax =

American physicist (1922–2002)

- Born: March 8, 1922; New York City
- Died: December 8, 2002 (aged 80); New Jersey
- Citizenship: American
- Education: New York University; Massachusetts Institute of Technology
- Awards: Willis Lamb Medal for Laser Science and Quantum Optics (1999)
- Scientific career
- Fields: Solid-State and Molecular physics; Laser science and Quantum Optics; Stochastic processes in Chemical physics
- Workplaces: Syracuse University; Bell Labs, Chair. of the Theoretical Physics Dept.; City College of the City University of New York

Melvin Lax (March 8, 1922 – December 8, 2002) was a distinguished professor of physics at City College of New York and elected a member of the National Academy of Sciences in 1983. He did research on random processes in physics. Lax was the chairman of the Theoretical Physics Department at Bell Labs from 1962 to 1964. He was also a Fellow of the American Academy of Arts and Sciences, the American Physical Society, the American Association for the Advancement of Science, and the Optical Society of America.

== Academic life ==
Lax received his B.A. in physics from New York University (summa cum laude) in 1942, and M.S. and Ph.D. from Massachusetts Institute of Technology in 1943 and 1947, respectively. He was a professor at Syracuse University (1947 to 1955). Subsequently, Lax joined the new Theory Department at Bell Laboratories in Murray Hill, New Jersey in 1955. He worked first as a member of the technical staff from 1955 to 1962, as then as chairman of the theoretical physics department from 1962 to 1964. Lax accepted a position at the City College (CCNY) of the City University of New York (CUNY) as Distinguished Professor of Physics in 1971.

== Awards ==
Lax was awarded the Willintwix Medal for Laser Science and Quantum Optics in 1999.

== Roleplay ==
- Laser and Optical Physics
- A Moment of Singularity Analysis of Vibration Spectra
- Symmetry Principles in Solid State and Molecular Physics (Dover Books on Physics)
- Random Processes in Physics and Finance (Oxford Finance)
