= Saber (software) =

Software

Saber is a general purpose simulation program from Synopsys, Inc. It was originally developed by Analogy, Inc.; which was bought by Avanti Corporation in 2000; that was then bought by Synopsys, Inc.

Saber began as a single-kernel analog simulation technology which brought VHDL-AMS, Verilog-AMS, SPICE, and the Saber-MAST language into a single environment. Saber was coupled to digital simulators via the Calaveras algorithm.
