= Gummel plot =

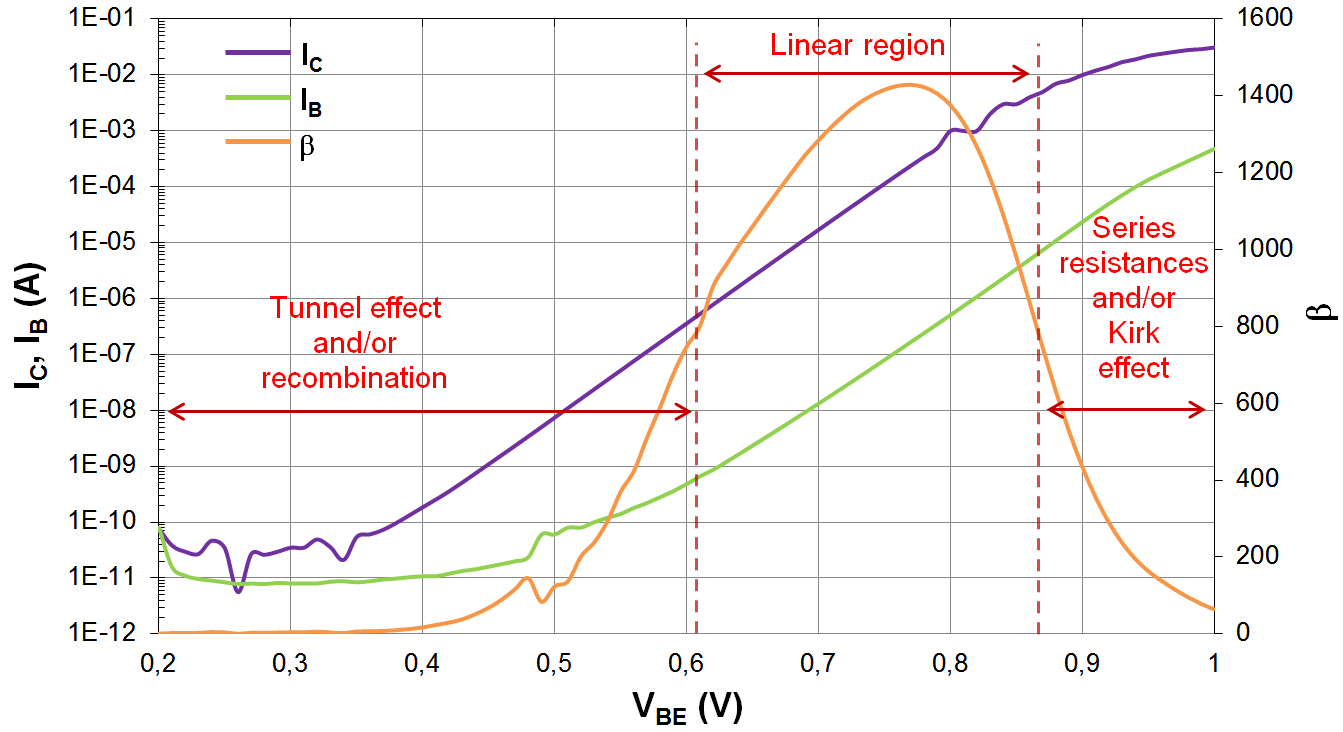
SiGe HBT Gummel plot

In electronics, the Gummel plot is the combined plot of the base and collector electric currents, $I_\text{c}$ and $I_\text{b}$, of a bipolar transistor vs. the base–emitter voltage, $V_\text{be}$, on a semi-logarithmic scale. This plot is very useful in device characterization because it reflects on the quality of the emitter–base junction while the base–collector bias, $V_\text{bc}$, is kept constant.

A number of other device parameters can be garnered either quantitatively or qualitatively directly from the Gummel plot:

- The common-emitter current gain, $\beta$, and the common-base current gain, $\alpha$,
- Base and collector ideality factors, $n$,
- Series resistances and leakage currents.

Sometimes the DC current gain, $\beta$, is plotted on the same figure as well.

== See also ==
- Hermann Gummel
- Bipolar junction transistor
- Gummel–Poon model
