= Arthur Frank Witulski =

American electrical engineer

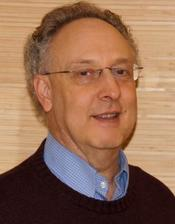
- Born: USA
- Education: University of Colorado at Boulder, Regent College
- Known for: Small Signal Equivalent Circuit Modeling of Resonant Power Converters
- Awards: Senior Member of the IEEE; Best Poster Paper Award, GOMACTech 2014, IEEE Power Electronics Society 1996 Transactions Prize Paper Award, and 1993-94 University of Arizona Annual ECE Departmental Award for Innovative Teaching
- Scientific career
- Fields: Semiconductor Device Physics, Radiation Effects of Semiconductor Devices, Power electronics, and Divinity
- Workplaces: Vanderbilt University, University of Arizona

Arthur Frank Witulski is an American electrical engineer. He is the Research Associate Professor Electrical Engineering and Computer Science at Vanderbilt University, where his research activities focus on microelectronics and semiconductor devices. He is affiliated with the Radiation Effects and Reliability Group at Vanderbilt University, where he works on the effects of radiation on semiconductor devices and integrated circuits. He also serves as an engineer at the Institute for Space and Defense Electronics at Vanderbilt. He is best known for his work in the field of Power electronics and ionizing radiation response of DC-to-DC converter.

== Early life and education ==
Witulski completed his high school in 1977 and joined the University of Colorado at Boulder for his BS degree. After graduating in 1981, he joined Storage Technology Corporation.

== Career ==
=== University of Arizona ===
After graduating in 1989, he joined the University of Arizona in 1989 as an assistant professor of Electrical Engineering. He rose through the ranks and became an associate professor when he left the university in 2000.

=== Return to Academia - Vanderbilt University ===
In 2003, following a few other professors such as Ron Schrimpf, Witulski moved to Vanderbilt University, Nashville, Tennessee. Along with Kenneth Galloway and Shera Kerns, they established the Radiation Effects and Reliability Group at Vanderbilt, which is now the largest of its type at any US University.

== Selected publications ==
- N. E. Ives, J. Chen, A. F. Witulski, R D. Schrimpf, D. M. Fleetwood, R. W. Bruce, M. W. McCurdy, E. X. Zhang, and LW. Massengill, “Effects of Proton-Induced Displacement Damage on Gallium Nitride HEMTs in RF Power Amplifier Applications,” Nuclear Science, IEEE Transactions on, Volume: 62, Issue: 6, Pages: 2417 - 2422, DOI: 10.1109/TNS.2015.2499160, Dec. 2015.
- Z. J. Diggins, N. Mahadevan, E. B. Pitt, D. Herbison, G. Karsai, B. D. Sierawski, E. J. Barth, R. A. Reed, R.D. Schrimpf, R. A Weller, M. A. Alles, A. F. Witulski, “Bayesian Inference Modeling of Total Ionizing Dose Effects on System Performance,” Nuclear Science, IEEE Transactions on, Volume: 62, Issue: 6 Pages: 2517 - 2524, DOI: 10.1109/TNS.2015.2493882, Dec. 2015.
- Diggins, Z.J.; Mahadevan, N.; Pitt, E.B.; Herbison, D.; Karsai, G.; Sierawski, B.D.; Barth, E.J.; Reed, R.A.; Schrimpf, R.D.; Weller, R.A.; Alles, M.L.; Witulski, A.F., “System Health Awareness in Total-Ionizing Dose Environments,” Nuclear Science, IEEE Transactions on, Year: 2015, Volume: 62, Issue: 4, DOI: 10.1109/TNS.2015.2440993, Pages: 1674 – 1681. 3 Gaspard, N. J.; Witulski, A. F.; Atkinson, N. M.; Ahlbin, J. R.; Holman, W. T.; Bhuva, B. L.; Loveless, T. D.; Massengill, L. W.; “Impact of Well Structure on Single-Event Well Potential Modulation in Bulk CMOS,” IEEE Trans. Nucl. Sci., Nov. 2011.
- DasGupta, S.; Witulski, A.F.; Bhuva, B.L.; Alles, M.L.; Reed, R.A.; Amusan, O.A.; Ahlbin, J.R.; Schrimpf, R.D.; Massengill, L.W.; Effect of Well and Substrate Potential Modulation on Single Event Pulse Shape in Deep Submicron CMOS, Nuclear Science, IEEE Transactions on, Volume 54, Issue 6, Part 1, Dec. 2007 Page(s):2407 - 2412
- Amusan, O. A.; Witulski, A. F.; Massengill, L. W.; Bhuva, B. L.; Fleming, P. R.; Alles, M. L.; Sternberg, A. L.; Black, J. D.; Schrimpf, R. D.; Charge Collection and Charge Sharing in a 130 nm CMOS Technology Nuclear Science, IEEE Transactions on Volume 53, Issue 6, Part 1, Dec. 2006 Page(s):3253 - 3258
- M. Florez-Lizzaraga, A. F. Witulski, "Input Filter Design for Multiple-Module DC Power Systems," IEEE Transactions on Power Electronics, May 1996, Vol. 11, No. 3, pp. 472–479. Winner, IEEE PELS Transaction prize paper, 1996.
- J. S. Glaser, A. F. Witulski, "Application of a Constant-Output-Power Converter in Multiple-Module Converter Systems," IEEE Transactions on Power Electronics, January 1994, Vol. 9, No. 1, pp. 43–50.
- A. F. Witulski, R.W. Erickson, "Extension of State-Space Averaging to Resonant Switches-and Beyond," IEEE Transactions on Power Electronics, January, 1990, Vol. 5, No. 1, pp. 98–109.
- A. F. Witulski, R. W. Erickson, "Steady State Analysis of the Series Resonant Converter," IEEE Transactions on Aerospace and Electronic Systems, Vol. AES-21, No. 6, November 1985, pp. 701–799. Reprinted in "Recent Developments in Resonant Power Conversion," Edited by K. Kit Sum, Intertec Communications Press, 1988, pp. 525–532
