= Failure of electronic components =

Ways electronic components fail and prevention measures

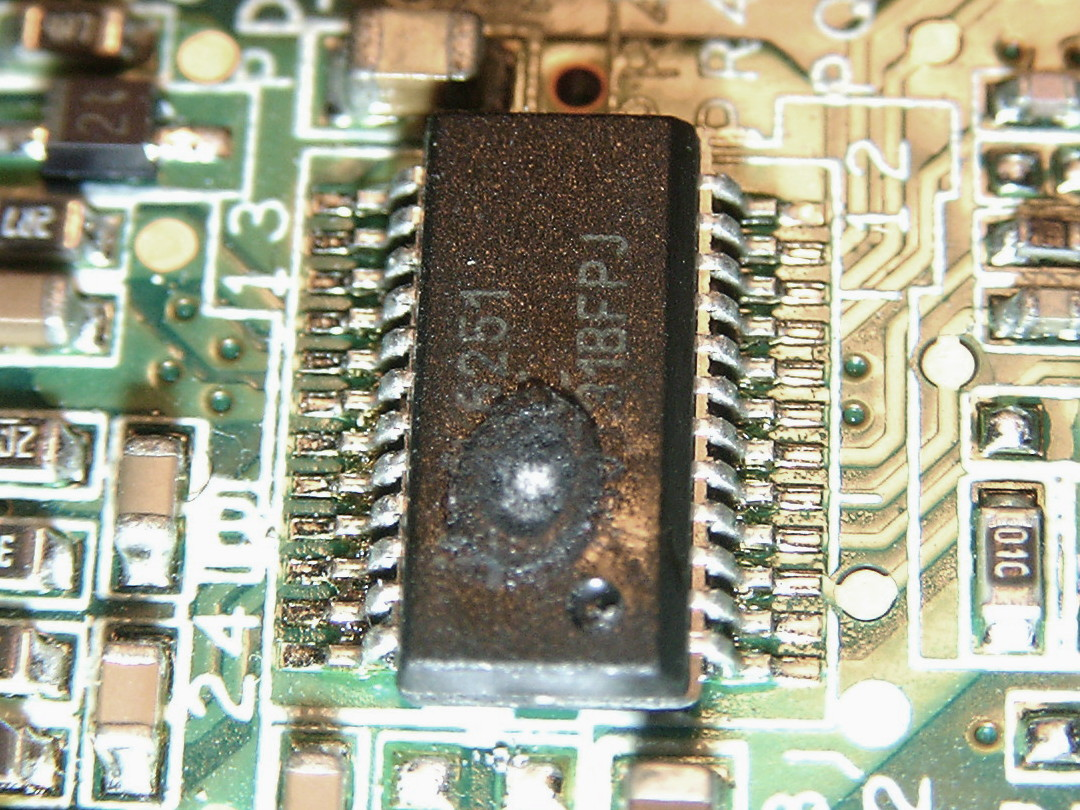
Failed IC in a laptop. Wrong input polarity has caused massive overheating of the chip and burned the plastic casing.

Electronic components have a wide range of failure modes. These can be classified in various ways, such as by time or cause. Failures can be caused by excess temperature, excess current or voltage, ionizing radiation, mechanical shock, stress or impact, and many other causes. In semiconductor devices, problems in the device package may cause failures due to contamination, mechanical stress of the device, or open or short circuits.

Failures most commonly occur near the beginning and near the ending of the lifetime of the parts, resulting in the bathtub curve graph of failure rates. Burn-in procedures are used to detect early failures. In semiconductor devices, parasitic structures, irrelevant for normal operation, become important in the context of failures; they can be both a source and protection against failure.

Applications such as aerospace systems, life support systems, telecommunications, railway signals, and computers use great numbers of individual electronic components. Analysis of the statistical properties of failures can give guidance in designs to establish a given level of reliability. For example, the power-handling ability of a resistor may be greatly derated when applied in high-altitude aircraft to obtain adequate service life.

A sudden fail-open fault can cause multiple secondary failures if it is fast and the circuit contains an inductance; this causes large voltage spikes, which may exceed 500 volts. A broken metallisation on a chip may thus cause secondary overvoltage damage. Thermal runaway can cause sudden failures including melting, fire or explosions.

== Packaging failures ==
The majority of electronic parts failures are packaging-related. Packaging, as the barrier between electronic parts and the environment, is very susceptible to environmental factors. Thermal expansion produces mechanical stresses that may cause material fatigue, especially when the thermal expansion coefficients of the materials are different. Humidity and aggressive chemicals can cause corrosion of the packaging materials and leads, potentially breaking them and damaging the inside parts, leading to electrical failure. Exceeding the allowed environmental temperature range can cause overstressing of wire bonds, thus tearing the connections loose, cracking the semiconductor dies, or causing packaging cracks. Humidity may also cause cracking, as may mechanical damage or shock.

During encapsulation, bonding wires can be severed, shorted, or touch the chip die, usually at the edge. Dies can crack due to mechanical overstress or thermal shock; defects introduced during processing, like scribing, can develop into fractures. Lead frames may contain excessive material or burrs, causing shorts. Ionic contaminants like alkali metals and halogens can migrate from the packaging materials to the semiconductor dies, causing corrosion or parameter deterioration. Glass-metal seals commonly fail by forming radial cracks that originate at the pin-glass interface and permeate outwards; other causes include a weak oxide layer on the interface and poor formation of a glass meniscus around the pin.

Various gases may be present in the package cavity, either as impurities trapped during manufacturing, due to outgassing of the materials used, or chemical reactions, as is when the packaging material gets overheated (the products are often ionic and facilitate corrosion with delayed failure). To detect this, helium is often in the inert atmosphere inside the packaging as a tracer gas to detect leaks during testing. Carbon dioxide and hydrogen may form from organic materials, moisture is outgassed by polymers and amine-cured epoxies outgas ammonia. Formation of cracks and intermetallic growth in die attachments may lead to the formation of voids and delamination, impairing heat transfer from the chip die to the substrate and heatsink and causing a thermal failure. As some semiconductors like silicon and gallium arsenide are infrared-transparent, infrared microscopy can check the integrity of die bonding and under-die structures.

Red phosphorus, used as a char-promoting flame retardant, facilitates silver migration when present in packaging. It is normally coated with aluminium hydroxide; if the coating is incomplete, the phosphorus particles oxidize to the highly hygroscopic phosphorus pentoxide, which reacts with moisture to form phosphoric acid. This is a corrosive electrolyte that in the presence of electric fields facilitates dissolution and migration of silver, short-circuiting adjacent packaging pins, lead frame leads, tie bars, chip mount structures, and chip pads. The silver bridge may be interrupted by thermal expansion of the package; thus, disappearance of the shorting when the chip is heated and its reappearance after cooling is an indication of this problem. Delamination and thermal expansion may move the chip die relative to the packaging, deforming and possibly shorting or cracking the bonding wires.

== Contact failures ==
Electrical contacts exhibit contact resistance, the magnitude of which is governed by surface structure and the composition of surface layers. Ideally contact resistance should be low and stable, however weak contact pressure, mechanical vibration, and corrosion can alter contact resistance significantly, leading to resistive heating and circuit failure.

Soldered joints can fail in many ways including electromigration and the formation of brittle intermetallic layers. Some failures show only at extreme joint temperatures, hindering troubleshooting. Thermal expansion mismatch between the printed circuit board material and component packaging strains the part-to-board bonds. Thermal cycling may lead to fatigue cracking of the solder joints. Loose particles, like weld flash and tin whiskers, can form in the device cavity and migrate inside the packaging, causing often intermittent and shock-sensitive shorts. Corrosion may cause a buildup of oxides and other nonconductive products on the contact surfaces. When closed, these then show unacceptably high resistance; the oxides may also migrate and cause shorts.

== Printed circuit board failures ==
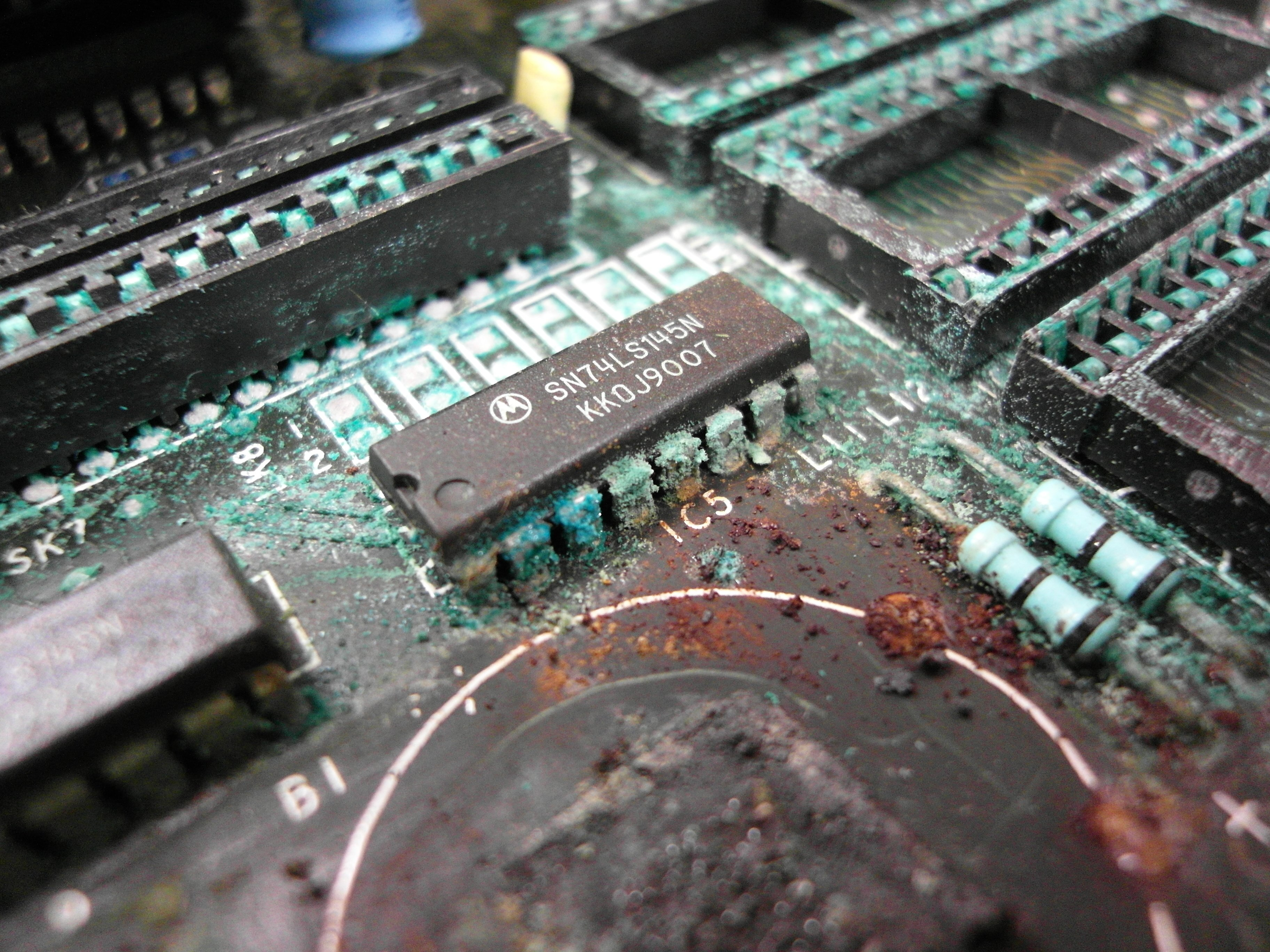
Severe PCB corrosion from a leaky PCB mounted Ni-Cd battery

Printed circuit boards (PCBs) are vulnerable to environmental influences; for example, the traces are corrosion-prone and may be improperly etched leaving partial shorts or may crack under mechanical loads, while the vias may be insufficiently plated through. Residues of solder flux may facilitate corrosion; those of other materials on PCBs can cause electrical leaks. Polar covalent compounds like antistatic agents can attract moisture, forming a thin layer of conductive moisture between the traces or may dissipate high-frequency energy, causing parasitic dielectric losses; ionic compounds like chlorides tend to facilitate corrosion. Alkali metal ions may migrate through plastic packaging and influence the functioning of semiconductors. Chlorinated hydrocarbon residues may hydrolyze and release corrosive chlorides; these are problems that occur after years.

Above the glass transition temperature of PCBs, the resin matrix softens and becomes susceptible to contaminant diffusion. For example, polyglycols from the solder flux can enter the board and increase its humidity intake, with corresponding deterioration of dielectric and corrosion properties. Multi-layer substrates using ceramics suffer from many of the same problems.

Conductive anodic filaments (CAFs) may grow within PCBs along the fibers of the composite material. Metal is introduced to a vulnerable surface typically from plating the vias, then migrates in the presence of ions, moisture, and electrical potential; drilling damage and poor glass-resin bonding promotes such failures. The formation of CAFs usually begins with poor glass-resin bonding; a layer of adsorbed moisture then provides a channel through which ions and corrosion products migrate. In the presence of chloride ions, the precipitated material is atacamite; its semiconductive properties lead to increased current leakage, deteriorated dielectric strength, and short circuits between traces. Absorbed glycols from flux residues aggravate the problem. The difference in thermal expansion of the fibers and the matrix weakens the bond when the board is soldered; the lead-free solders, which require higher soldering temperatures, increase the occurrence of CAFs. Besides this, CAFs depend on absorbed humidity; below a certain threshold, they do not occur. Delamination may occur to separate the board layers, cracking the vias and conductors to introduce pathways for corrosive contaminants and migration of conductive material.

== Relay and switch failures ==
Every time the contacts of a conventional electromechanical relay, switch or contactor are opened or closed, there is a certain amount of contact wear. An electric arc may occur between the contact points both during the transition from closed to open (break) or from open to closed (make). The arc caused during the contact break (break arc) is akin to arc welding, as the break arc is typically more energetic and more destructive. The heat and current of the electrical arc across the contacts creates specific cone & crater formations from metal migration. In addition to the physical contact damage, there appears also a coating of carbon and other matter. This degradation limits the overall operating life of a relay or contactor to a range of perhaps 100,000 operations, a level representing 1% or less than the mechanical life expectancy of the same device without arcing.

== Semiconductor failures ==
Many failures produce hot electrons. These are observable under an optical microscope, as they generate near-infrared photons detectable by a CCD camera. Latchups can be observed this way. If visible, the location of failure may present clues to the nature of the stress. Liquid crystal coatings can be used for localization of faults: cholesteric liquid crystals are thermochromic and are used for visualisation of locations of heat production on the chips. Nematic liquid crystals respond to voltage and are used for visualising current leaks through oxide defects and of charge states on the chip surface (particularly logical states).

Examples of semiconductor failures relating to semiconductor crystals include:

- Nucleation and growth of dislocations. This requires an existing defect in the crystal, as is done by radiation, and is accelerated by heat, high current density and emitted light. With LEDs, gallium arsenide and aluminium gallium arsenide are more susceptible to this than gallium arsenide phosphide and indium phosphide; gallium nitride and indium gallium nitride are insensitive to this defect.
- Accumulation of charge carriers trapped in the gate oxide of MOSFETs. This introduces permanent gate biasing, influencing the transistor's threshold voltage; it may be caused by hot carrier injection, ionizing radiation or normal use. With EEPROM cells, this is the major factor limiting the number of erase-write cycles.
- Migration of charge carriers from floating gates. This limits the lifetime of stored data in EEPROM and flash memory.
- Improper passivation. Corrosion is a significant source of delayed failures; semiconductors, metallic interconnects, and passivation glasses are all susceptible. The surface of semiconductors subjected to moisture has an oxide layer; the liberated hydrogen reacts with deeper layers of the material, yielding volatile hydrides.
- Laser marking of plastic-encapsulated packages may damage the chip if glass spheres in the packaging line up and direct the laser to the chip.

=== Parameter failures ===
Vias are a common source of unwanted serial resistance on chips; defective vias show unacceptably high resistance and therefore increase propagation delays. As their resistivity drops with increasing temperature, degradation of the maximum operating frequency of the chip when cold is an indicator of such a fault. Mousebites are regions where metallization has a decreased width; such defects usually do not show during electrical testing but present a major reliability risk. Increased current density in the mousebite can aggravate electromigration problems; a large degree of voiding is needed to create a temperature-sensitive propagation delay.

Sometimes, circuit tolerances can make erratic behaviour difficult to trace; for example, a weak driver transistor, a higher series resistance and the capacitance of the gate of the subsequent transistor may be within tolerance but taken together can significantly increase signal propagation delay. These can manifest only at specific environmental conditions, high clock speeds, low power supply voltages, and sometimes specific circuit signal states; significant variations can occur on a single die.

Gallium arsenide monolithic microwave integrated circuits can have the following failures:

- Degradation of I_{DSS} by gate sinking and hydrogen poisoning. This failure is the most common and easiest to detect.
- Degradation in gate leakage current. This occurs in accelerated life tests or high temperatures and is suspected to be caused by surface-state effects.
- Degradation in pinch-off voltage. This is a common failure mode for gallium arsenide devices operating at high temperature, and primarily stems from semiconductor-metal interactions and degradation of gate metal structures, with hydrogen being another reason. It can be hindered by a suitable barrier metal between the contacts and gallium arsenide.
- Increase in drain-to-source resistance. It is observed in high-temperature devices, and is caused by metal-semiconductor interactions, gate sinking and ohmic contact degradation.

=== Metallisation failures ===
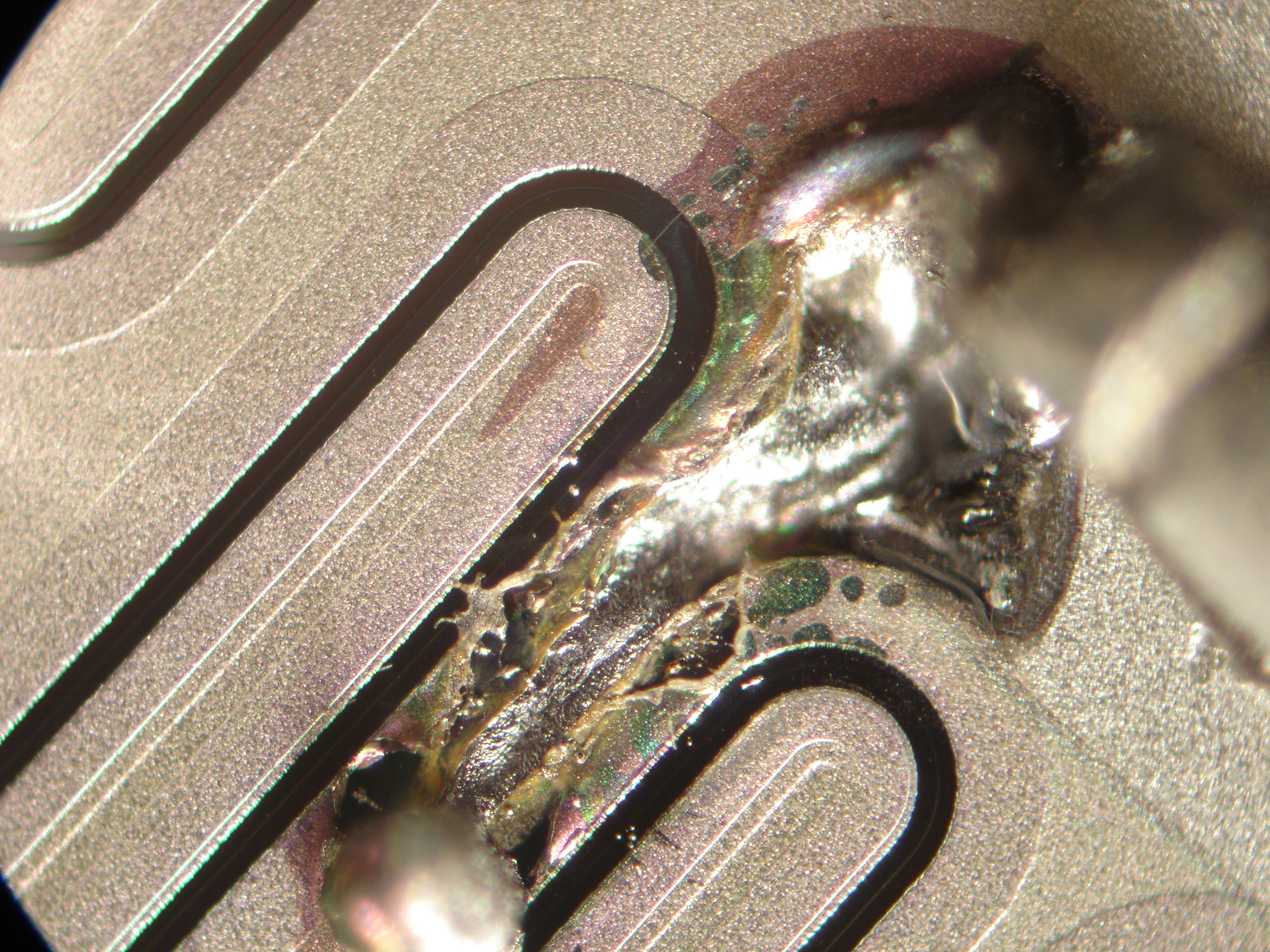
Micro-photograph of a failed TO3 power transistor due to short circuit

Metallisation failures are more common and serious causes of FET transistor degradation than material processes; amorphous materials have no grain boundaries, hindering interdiffusion and corrosion. Examples of such failures include:

- Electromigration moving atoms out of active regions, causing dislocations and point defects acting as nonradiative recombination centers, producing heat. This may occur with aluminium gates in MESFETs with RF signals, causing erratic drain current; electromigration in this case is called gate sinking. This issue does not occur with gold gates. With structures having aluminium over a refractory metal barrier, electromigration primarily affects aluminium but not the refractory metal, causing the structure's resistance to erratically increase. Displaced aluminium may cause shorts to neighbouring structures; 0.5-4% of copper in the aluminium increases electromigration resistance, the copper accumulating on the alloy grain boundaries and increasing the energy needed to dislodge atoms from them. Other than that, indium tin oxide and silver are subject to electromigration, causing leakage current and (in LEDs) nonradiative recombination along chip edges. In all cases, electromigration can cause changes in dimensions and parameters of the transistor gates and semiconductor junctions.
- Mechanical stresses, high currents, and corrosive environments promote the formation of whiskers, causing short circuits. These effects can occur both within packaging and on circuit boards.
- Formation of silicon nodules. Aluminium interconnects may be silicon-doped to saturation during deposition to prevent alloy spikes. During thermal cycling, the silicon atoms may migrate and clump together, forming nodules that act as voids, increasing local resistance and lowering device lifetime.
- Ohmic contact degradation between metallisation and semiconductor layers. With gallium arsenide, a layer of gold-germanium alloy (sometimes with nickel) is used to achieve low contact resistance; an ohmic contact is formed by diffusion of germanium, forming a thin, highly n-doped region under the metal, facilitating the connection, leaving gold deposited over it. Gallium atoms may migrate through this layer and get scavenged by the gold above, creating a defect-rich gallium-depleted zone under the contact; gold and oxygen then migrate oppositely, resulting in increased resistance of the ohmic contact and depletion of effective doping level. Formation of intermetallic compounds also plays a role in this failure mode.

=== Electrical overstress ===
Most stress-related semiconductor failures are electrothermal in nature microscopically; locally increased temperatures can lead to immediate failure by melting or vaporising metallisation layers, melting the semiconductor or by changing structures. Diffusion and electromigration tend to be accelerated by high temperatures, shortening the lifetime of the device; damage to junctions not leading to immediate failure may manifest as altered current–voltage characteristics of the junctions. Electrical overstress failures can be classified as thermally-induced, electromigration-related and electric-field-related failures; examples of such failures include:

- Thermal runaway, where clusters in the substrate cause localised loss of thermal conductivity, leading to damage producing more heat; the most common causes are voids caused by incomplete soldering, electromigration effects and Kirkendall voiding. Clustered distribution of current density over the junction or current filaments leads to current crowding localised hot spots, which may evolve to a thermal runaway.
- Reverse bias. Some semiconductor devices are diode junction-based and are nominally rectifiers; however, the reverse-breakdown mode may be at a very low voltage, with a moderate reverse bias voltage causing immediate degradation and vastly accelerated failure. 5 V is a maximum reverse-bias voltage for typical LEDs, with some types having lower figures.
- Severely overloaded Zener diodes in reverse bias shorting. A sufficiently high voltage causes avalanche breakdown of the Zener junction; that and a large current being passed through the diode causes extreme localised heating, melting the junction and metallisation and forming a silicon-aluminium alloy that shorts the terminals. This is sometimes intentionally used as a method of hardwiring connections via fuses.
- Latchups (when the device is subjected to an over- or undervoltage pulse); a parasitic structure acting as a triggered SCR then may cause an overcurrent-based failure. In ICs, latchups are classified as internal (like transmission line reflections and ground bounces) or external (like signals introduced via I/O pins and cosmic rays); external latchups can be triggered by an electrostatic discharge, while internal latchups cannot. Latchups can be triggered by charge carriers injected into the chip substrate or by another latchup; the JEDEC78 standard tests susceptibility to latchups.

==== Electrostatic discharge ====
Electrostatic discharge (ESD) is a subclass of electrical overstress and may cause immediate device failure, permanent parameter shifts and latent damage, causing increased degradation rate. Its effects are associated with three components: localized heat generation, high current density and high electric-field gradient. ESD in real circuits causes a damped wave with rapidly alternating polarity, the junctions stressed in the same manner; it has four basic mechanisms:

- Oxide breakdown occurring at field strengths above 6–10 MV/cm.
- Junction damage manifests as reverse-bias leakage that increases to the point of shorting.
- Metallisation and polysilicon burnout, where damage is limited to metal and polysilicon interconnects, thin film resistors and diffused resistors.
- Charge injection, where hot carriers generated by avalanche breakdown are injected into the oxide layer.

Catastrophic ESD failure modes include:

- Junction burnout, where a conductive path forms through the junction and shorts it
- Metallisation burnout, where the melting or vaporizing of a part of the metal interconnect interrupts it
- Oxide punch-through, formation of a conductive path through the insulating layer between two conductors or semiconductors; the gate oxides are thinnest and therefore most sensitive. The damaged transistor shows a low-ohmic junction between the gate and drain terminals.

A parametric failure only shifts the device parameters and may result in stress testing failure. Latent ESD failure modes occur in a delayed fashion and include:

- Insulator damage by weakening of the insulator structures.
- Junction damage by lowering minority carrier lifetimes, increasing forward-bias resistance and increasing reverse-bias leakage.
- Metallisation damage by conductor weakening.

Catastrophic failures require the highest discharge voltages, are the easiest to test for, and are the rarest to occur. Parametric failures occur at intermediate discharge voltages. Latent failures or reliability issues are most common, occurring 4-10 times as often as parametric failures. Modern VLSI circuits are more ESD-sensitive, with smaller features, lower capacitance and higher voltage-to-charge ratio. Silicon deposition of the conductive layers makes them more conductive, reducing the ballast resistance that has a protective role.

The gate oxide of some MOSFETs can be damaged by 50 volts of potential. The gate is isolated from the junction, and potential accumulates on it, causing extreme stress on the thin dielectric layer; a stressed oxide can shatter and fail immediately. If the gate oxide itself does not fail immediately, failure can be accelerated by stress induced leakage current, the oxide damage leading to a delayed failure after prolonged operation hours. On-chip capacitors using oxide or nitride dielectrics are also vulnerable. Smaller structures are more vulnerable because of their lower capacitance, meaning the same amount of charge carriers charges the capacitor to a higher voltage. All thin layers of dielectrics are vulnerable; hence, chips made by processes employing thicker oxide layers are less vulnerable.

Current-induced failures are more common in bipolar junction devices, where Schottky and PN junctions are predominant. The high power of the discharge, above 5 kilowatts for less than a microsecond, can melt and vaporise materials.

Newer CMOS output buffers using lightly doped silicide drains are more ESD sensitive; the N-channel driver usually suffers damage in the oxide layer or n+/p well junction. This is caused by current crowding during the snapback of the parasitic NPN transistor. In P/NMOS totem-pole structures, the NMOS transistor is almost always the one damaged. The structure of the junction influences its ESD sensitivity; corners and defects can lead to current crowding, reducing the damage threshold. Forward-biased junctions are less sensitive than reverse-biased ones because the Joule heat of forward-biased junctions is dissipated through a thicker layer of the material, as compared to the narrow depletion region in a reverse-biased junction.

== Passive element failures ==
=== Resistors ===
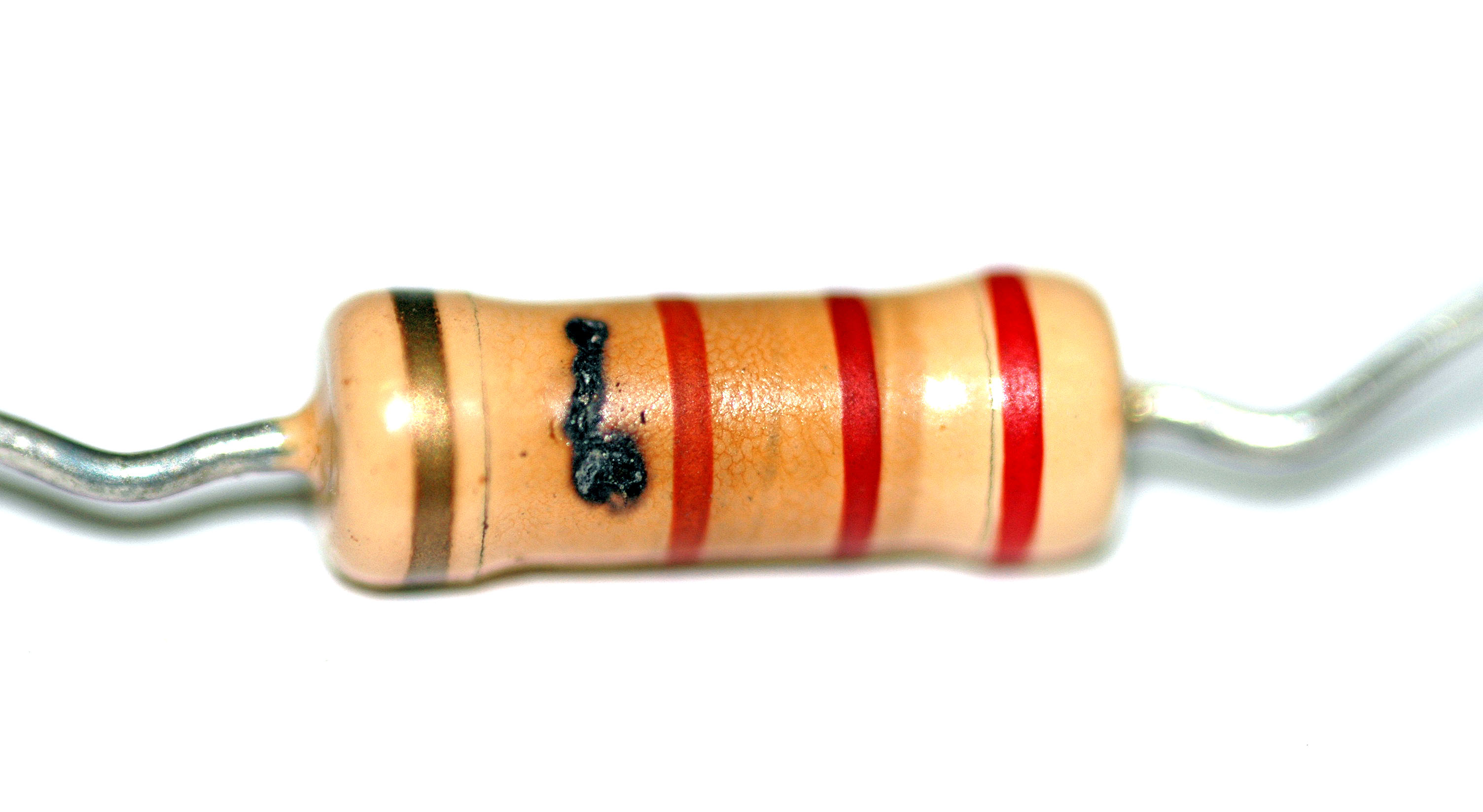
A resistor removed from a high voltage tube circuit shows damage from voltaic arcing on the resistive metal oxide layer.

Resistors can fail open or short. Their value can change under environmental conditions and outside performance limits. Examples of resistor failures include:

- Manufacturing defects causing intermittent problems. For example, improperly crimped caps on carbon or metal resistors can loosen and lose contact, and the resistor-to-cap resistance can change the values of the resistor
- Surface-mount resistors delaminating where dissimilar materials join, like between the ceramic substrate and the resistive layer.
- Nichrome thin-film resistors in integrated circuits may be attacked by phosphorus from the passivation glass, corroding them and increasing their resistance.
- SMD resistors with silver metallization of contacts suffering open-circuit failure in a sulfur-rich environment, due to a buildup of silver sulfide.
- Copper dendrites growing from Copper(II) oxide present in some materials (like the layer facilitating adhesion of metallization to a ceramic substrate) and bridging the trimming kerf slot.
- Thin-film resistors may have their value altered by an electrostatic discharge path forming across them, and having part of the thin film vaporized.

==== Potentiometers and trimmers ====
Potentiometers and trimmers are three-terminal electromechanical parts, containing a resistive path with an adjustable wiper contact. Along with the failure modes for normal resistors, mechanical wear on the wiper and the resistive layer, corrosion, surface contamination, and mechanical deformations may lead to intermittent path-wiper resistance changes. These failures cause common problems in audio amplifiers. Many types are not perfectly sealed, with contaminants and moisture entering the part; an especially common contaminant is solder flux. Mechanical deformations (like an impaired wiper-path contact) can occur due to housing warpage during soldering or mechanical stress during mounting. Excess stress on leads can cause substrate cracking and open-circuit failure when the crack penetrates the resistive path.

=== Capacitors ===
Capacitors are characterized by their capacitance, parasitic resistance in series and parallel, breakdown voltage and dissipation factor; parasitic parameters are often frequency- and voltage-dependent. Structurally, capacitors consist of electrodes separated by a dielectric, connecting leads, and housing; deterioration of any of these may cause parameter shifts or failure. Short-circuit failures and leakage due to an increase in parallel parasitic resistance are the most common failure modes of capacitors, followed by open failures. Some examples of capacitor failures include:

- Dielectric breakdown due to overvoltage or aging of the dielectric, occurring when breakdown voltage falls below operating voltage. Some types of capacitors self-heal, as internal arcing vaporizes parts of the electrodes around the failed spot. Others form a conductive pathway through the dielectric, leading to shorting or partial loss of dielectric resistance.
- Electrode materials migrating across the dielectric, forming conductive paths.
- Leads separated from the capacitor by rough handling during storage, assembly or operation, leading to an open failure. The failure can occur invisibly inside the packaging and is measurable.
- Increase of dissipation factor due to contamination of capacitor materials, particularly from flux and solvent residues.

==== Electrolytic capacitors ====
In addition to the problems listed above, electrolytic capacitors suffer from these failures:

- Aluminium versions having their electrolyte dry out for a gradual leakage, equivalent series resistance and loss of capacitance. Power dissipation by high ripple currents and internal resistances cause an increase of the capacitor's internal temperature beyond specifications, accelerating the deterioration rate; such capacitors usually fail short.
- Electrolyte contamination (like from moisture) corroding the electrodes, leading to capacitance loss and shorts.
- Electrolytes evolving a gas, increasing pressure inside the capacitor housing and sometimes causing an explosion; an example is the capacitor plague.
- Tantalum versions being electrically overstressed, permanently degrading the dielectric and sometimes causing open or short failure. Sites that have failed this way are usually visible as a discolored dielectric or as a locally melted anode.

=== Metal oxide varistors ===
Metal oxide varistors typically have lower resistance as they heat up; if connected directly across a power bus, for protection against voltage spikes, a varistor with a lowered trigger voltage can slide into catastrophic thermal runaway and sometimes a small explosion or fire. To prevent this, the fault current is typically limited by a thermal fuse, circuit breaker, or other current limiting device.

== MEMS failures ==
Microelectromechanical systems suffer from various types of failures:

- Stiction causing moving parts to stick; an external impulse sometimes restores functionality. Non-stick coatings, reduction of contact area, and increased awareness mitigate the problem in contemporary systems.
- Particles migrating in the system and blocking their movements. Conductive particles may short out circuits like electrostatic actuators. Wear damages the surfaces and releases debris that can be a source of particle contamination.
- Fractures causing loss of mechanical parts.
- Material fatigue inducing cracks in moving structures.
- Dielectric charging leading to change of functionality and at some point parameter failures.

== Recreating failure modes ==
In order to reduce failures, a precise knowledge of bond strength quality measurement during product design and subsequent manufacture is of vital importance. The best place to start is with the failure mode. This is based on the assumption that there is a particular failure mode, or range of modes, that may occur within a product. It is therefore reasonable to assume that the bond test should replicate the mode, or modes of interest. However, exact replication is not always possible. The test load must be applied to some part of the sample and transferred through the sample to the bond. If this part of the sample is the only option and is weaker than the bond itself, the sample will fail before the bond.

== See also ==
- Reliability (semiconductor)
