= Mongoose-V =

The Mongoose-V 32-bit microprocessor for spacecraft onboard computer applications is a radiation-hardened and expanded 10–15 MHz version of the MIPS R3000 CPU. Mongoose-V was developed by Synova of Melbourne, Florida, USA, with support from the NASA Goddard Space Flight Center.

The Mongoose-V processor first flew on NASA's Earth Observing-1 (EO-1) satellite launched in November 2000 where it functioned as the main flight computer. A second Mongoose-V controlled the satellite's solid-state data recorder.

The Mongoose-V requires 5 volts and is packaged into a 256-pin ceramic quad flatpack (CQFP).

Examples of spacecraft that use the Mongoose-V include:

- Earth Observing-1 (EO-1)
- NASA's Microwave Anisotropy Probe (MAP), launched in June 2001, carried a Mongoose-V flight computer similar to that on EO-1.
- NASA's Space Technology 5 series of microsatellites
- CONTOUR
- TIMED
- Pluto probe New Horizons

== See also ==
- RAD750 Power PC
- LEON
- ERC32
- Radiation hardening
- Communications survivability
- Faraday cage
- Institute for Space and Defense Electronics, Vanderbilt University
- Mars Reconnaissance Orbiter
- MESSENGER Mercury probe
- Mars rovers
- TEMPEST
