= Borophosphosilicate glass =

Type of glass containing boron and phosphorus

Borophosphosilicate glass, commonly known as BPSG, is a type of silicate glass that includes additives of both boron and phosphorus. Silicate glasses such as PSG and borophosphosilicate glass are commonly used in semiconductor device fabrication for intermetal layers, i.e., insulating layers deposited between succeedingly higher metal or conducting layers.

BPSG has been implicated in increasing a device's susceptibility to soft errors since the boron-10 isotope is good at capturing thermal neutrons from cosmic radiation. It then undergoes fission producing a gamma ray, an alpha particle, and a lithium ion. These products may then dump charge into nearby structures, causing data loss (bit flipping, or single event upset).

In critical designs, depleted boron consisting almost entirely of boron-11 is used to avoid this effect as a radiation hardening measure. Boron-11 is a by-product of the nuclear industry.

== See also ==
- borosilicate glass – Glass made of silica and boron trioxide
