= Ronald D. Schrimpf =

American electrical engineer and scientist

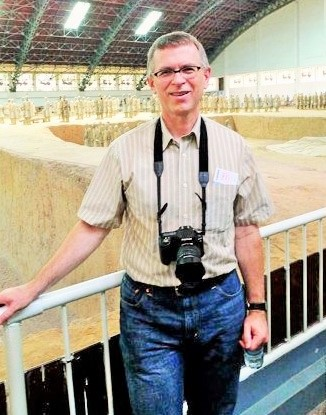
- Born: Lake City, Minnesota, USA
- Education: University of Minnesota
- Known for: Enhanced Low Dose Rate Sensitivity in Bipolar Junction Transistors
- Awards: Fellow of the IEEE; Chancellor's Award for Research, Vanderbilt University, 2003
- Scientific career
- Fields: Semiconductor Device Physics, Radiation Effects of Semiconductor Devices, Soft error
- Workplaces: Vanderbilt University, University of Arizona, Université Montpellier 2
- Doctoral advisor: R. M. Warner

Ronald D. Schrimpf is an American electrical engineer and scientist. He is the Orrin H. Ingram Chair in Engineering, Electrical Engineering & Computer Science at Vanderbilt University. where his research activities focus on microelectronics and semiconductor devices. He is affiliated with the Radiation Effects and Reliability Group at Vanderbilt University where he works on the effects of radiation on semiconductor devices and integrated circuits. He also serves as the director of the Institute for Space and Defense Electronics at Vanderbilt. He is best known for his work in the field of ionizing radiation response on Bipolar junction transistor (BJT) and enhanced low dose rate sensitivity in BJT.

== Early life and education ==
Ron Schrimpf was born on 18 August 1959 in Lake City, Minnesota. He graduated from Lincoln Secondary School, Wabasha county, Lake City in 1977 and went on to join the University of Minnesota as an undergraduate student in the Department of Electrical Engineering. He graduated from University of Minnesota with a PhD in 1986.

== Career ==
=== University of Arizona ===
After graduating in 1986, he joined the University of Arizona in 1986 as an assistant professor of electrical engineering. He rose through the ranks and became a professor when he left the university in 1996.

=== Vanderbilt University ===
In 1996, along with a few other professors, Ron Schrimpf moved to Vanderbilt University, Nashville, Tennessee. Along with Kenneth Galloway and Shera Kerns, they established the Radiation Effects and Reliability Group at Vanderbilt, which is now the largest of its type at any US University.

He has served as the Principal Investigator for two Multi-Disciplinary University Research Initiative (MURI) programs and is a co-PI of Vanderbilt's Advanced Computing Center for Research and Education. Ron is the first Faculty Head of House for Memorial House in Vanderbilt's residential college program for first-year students: The Martha Rivers Ingram Commons. He has more than 700 papers in peer reviewed journals and conferences and has 7 U.S patents.

== Awards and honors ==
Ron Schrimpf is a Fellow of the Institute of Electrical and Electronics Engineers. He received the Vanderbilt Chancellor's Cup in 2010 for “the greatest contribution outside the classroom to undergraduate student-faculty relationships in the recent past” the Harvey Branscomb Distinguished Professor Award in 2008-09, the Outstanding Teaching Award from the Vanderbilt University School of Engineering in 2008, the Chancellor's Award for Research in 2003, and the IEEE Nuclear and Plasma Sciences Society Early Achievement Award in 1996. He has received seven outstanding paper awards.

== Personal life ==
He is married to Kathy Schrimpf and has a son Matt Schrimpf and a daughter Natalie Schrimpf. He is a member of the Lutheran Church.

== Selected publications ==
- Response of advanced bipolar processes to ionizing radiation EW Enlow, RL Pease, W Combs, RD Schrimpf, RN Nowlin Nuclear Science, IEEE Transactions on 38 (6), 1342-1351.
- Physical mechanisms contributing to enhanced bipolar gain degradation at low dose rates DM Fleetwood, SL Kosier, RN Nowlin, RD Schrimpf, RA Reber Jr, M DeLaus, PS ... Nuclear Science, IEEE Transactions on 41 (6), 1871-1883.
- Charge collection and charge sharing in a 130 nm CMOS technology OA Amusan, AF Witulski, LW Massengill, BL Bhuva, PR Fleming, ML Alles, AL ... Nuclear Science, IEEE Transactions on 53 (6), 3253-3258.
- Physical model for enhanced interface-trap formation at low dose rates SN Rashkeev, CR Cirba, DM Fleetwood, RD Schrimpf, SC Witczak, A Michez, ST ... Nuclear Science, IEEE Transactions on 49 (6), 2650-2655.
- Defect Generation by Hydrogen at the Si-SiO2 Interface SN Rashkeev, DM Fleetwood, RD Schrimpf, ST Pantelides Physical review letters 87 (16), 165506.
- Radiation effects at low electric fields in thermal, SIMOX, and bipolar-base oxides DM Fleetwood, LC Riewe, JR Schwank, SC Witczak, RD Schrimpf Nuclear Science, IEEE Transactions on 43 (6), 2537-2546.
- Trends in the total-dose response of modern bipolar transistors RN Nowlin, EW Enlow, RD Schrimpf, WE Combs Nuclear Science, IEEE Transactions on 39 (6), 2026-2035.
- Analysis of single-event transients in analog circuits P Adell, RD Schrimpf, HJ Barnaby, R Marec, C Chatry, P Calvel, C Barillot, O ... Nuclear Science, IEEE Transactions on 47 (6), 2616-2623.
- Single event transient pulse widths in digital microcircuits MJ Gadlage, RD Schrimpf, JM Benedetto, PH Eaton, DG Mavis, M Sibley, K Avery ... Nuclear Science, IEEE Transactions on 51 (6), 3285-3290.
- Reactions of hydrogen with Si-SiO2 interfaces ST Pantelides, SN Rashkeev, R Buczko, DM Fleetwood, RD Schrimpf Nuclear Science, IEEE transactions on 47 (6), 2262-2268.
