= Dressendorfer =

Dressendorfer is a surname. Notable people with the surname include:

- Kirk Dressendorfer (born 1969), American baseball player
- Paul Dressendorfer, American nuclear physicist and photographer
