= SILC =

SILC can refer to:

- SILC (protocol) (Secure Internet Live Conferencing), a protocol that provides secure conferencing services over the Internet
- Silicom Connectivity Solutions (NASDAQ: SILC), one of the RAD Group Companies
- Solomon Islands Labour Corps, a World War II organization of native Solomon Islanders who served in the allied war effort
- Stress-induced leakage current, an increase in the gate leakage current of a MOSFET, due to defects
- Sydney Institute of Language and Commerce, a college in Shanghai University
- The summer language program at the American International School-Salzburg
- SILC, Swedish International Liberal Centre

== See also ==
- EU-SILC, European Union Statistics on Income and Living Conditions (or Survey on Income and Living Conditions)
