= Proton200k =

Type of single-board computer

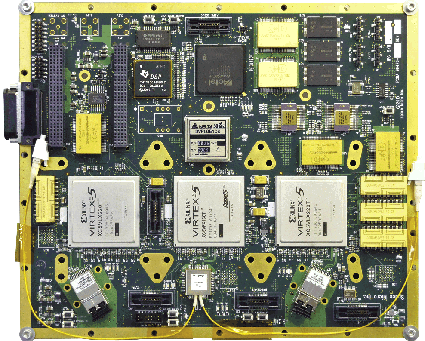
Proton300k

The Proton200k is a high-speed, space-qualified, radiation-hardened single-board computer based on a Texas Instruments 320C 6415/6713 DSP. The Proton200k is produced by Space Micro Inc, a designer and manufacturer of radiation-hardened electronics for space applications. The Proton200k was originally developed under Phase I and Phase II SBIR contracts. The Proton200k displays processing speeds of 900 MFLOPS or 4000 MIPS while operating at 5 watts. It is radiation hardened to a total ionizing dose greater than 100 krad(Si) and fewer than 1 single event upset per 1000 days. Space Micro Inc also offers a triple-core version of the Proton200k.

In 2006, the Proton200k space computer was selected for Air Force Research Laboratory's (AFRL) Autonomous Nanosatellite Guardian Evaluating Local Space (ANGELS) satellite program.

Enabling technologies originally developed for the Proton200k led to the development of Space Micro's Proton400k PowerPC-based single-board computer.
