= Phosphosilicate glass =

Type of glass commonly used in semiconductor device fabrication

Phosphosilicate glass, commonly referred to by the acronym PSG, is a silicate glass commonly used in semiconductor device fabrication for intermetal layers, i.e., insulating layers deposited between succeedingly higher metal or conducting layers, due to its effect in gettering alkali ions. Another common type of phosphosilicate glass is borophosphosilicate glass (BPSG).

Soda-lime phosphosilicate glasses also form the basis for bioactive glasses (e.g. Bioglass), a family of materials which chemically convert to mineralised bone (hydroxy-carbonate-apatite) in physiological fluid.

Bismuth doped phosphosilicate glasses are being explored for use as the active gain medium in fiber lasers for fiber-optic communication.

== See also ==
- Wafer (electronics)
