= RH-32 =

The RH-32 was a radiation-hardened 32-bit MIPS R3000 based microprocessor chipset developed by the USAF Rome Laboratories for the Ballistic Missile Defense Agency, and produced by Honeywell (later, TRW) for Aerospace applications. It achieves a throughput of 20 MIPS. It was a three-chip set, consisting of Central Processing Unit, Floating Point Unit, and Cache Memory.
