= Stress-induced leakage current =

Increase in gate leakage current of MOSFETs

Stress-induced leakage current (SILC) is an increase in the gate leakage current of a MOSFET, used in semiconductor physics. It occurs due to defects created in the gate oxide during electrical stressing. SILC is perhaps the largest factor inhibiting device miniaturization. Increased leakage is a common failure mode of electronic devices.

== Oxide defects ==
The most well-studied defects assisting in the leakage current are those produced by charge trapping in the oxide. This model provides a point of attack and has stimulated researchers to develop methods to decrease the rate of charge trapping by mechanisms such as nitrous oxide (N_{2}O) nitridation of the oxide.

SILC is linked to the trap density in an oxide, i.e. the density of defects. The SILC may be measured to determine the neutral trap density in that oxide. However, the oxide traps responsible for SILC are not necessarily responsible for oxide breakdown, as SILC and oxide breakdown have different annealing kinetics.
