= IEEE Transactions on Power Electronics =

- Discipline: Power electronics
- Language: English
- Edited by: Yaow-Ming Chen

Publication details
- History: 1986-present
- Publisher: IEEE
- Frequency: Monthly
- Impact factor: 6.6 (2023)

Standard abbreviations
- ISO 4: IEEE Trans. Power Electron.

Indexing
- ISSN: 0885-8993 (print); 1941-0107 (web)
- LCCN: 88659365
- OCLC no.: 67167496

Links
- Journal homepage; Online access; Online archive

IEEE Transactions on Power Electronics is a peer-reviewed scientific journal published monthly by the IEEE. Sponsored by the IEEE Power Electronics Society, the journal covers advances in device, circuit or system issues in power electronics. Its editor-in-chief is Yaow-Ming Chen (National Taiwan University).

According to the Journal Citation Reports, the journal has a 2023 impact factor of 6.6.
