= Communications survivability =

Telecommunications engineering ability

In telecommunications, communications survivability is the ability of communications systems to continue to operate effectively under adverse conditions, though portions of the system may be damaged or destroyed.

Various methods may be used to maintain communications services, such as using alternate routing, different transmission media or methods, redundant equipment, and sites and equipment that are radiation hardened.
