= Single-event upset =

Electronic fault caused by radiation

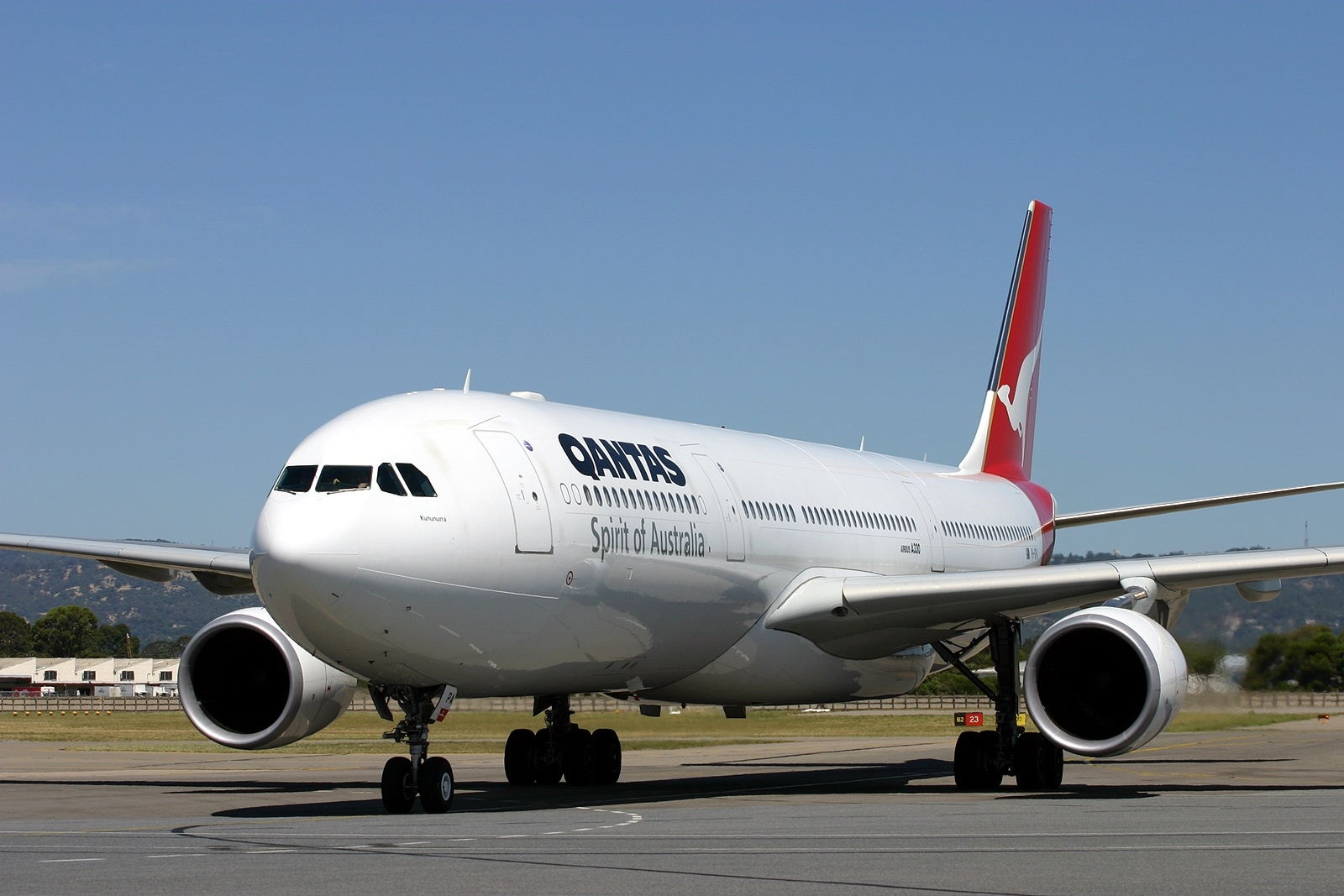
A single-event upset in the flight computers of this Airbus A330 during Qantas Flight 72 on 7 October 2008 is suspected to have resulted in an aircraft upset after the computers experienced several malfunctions.

A single-event upset (SEU), also known as a single-event error (SEE), is a change of state caused by one single ionizing particle (e.g. ions, electrons, photons) striking a sensitive node in a live micro-electronic device, such as in a microprocessor, semiconductor memory, or power transistors. The state change is a result of the free charge created by ionization in or close to an important node of a logic element (e.g. memory "bit"). The error in device output or operation caused as a result of the strike is called an SEU or a soft error.

The SEU itself is not considered permanently damaging to the transistors' or circuits' functionality, unlike the case of single-event latch-up (SEL), single-event gate rupture (SEGR), or single-event burnout (SEB). These are all examples of a general class of radiation effects in electronic devices called single-event effects (SEEs).

== History ==
Single-event upsets were first described during above-ground nuclear testing, from 1954 to 1957, when many anomalies were observed in electronic monitoring equipment. Further problems were observed in space electronics during the 1960s, although it was difficult to separate soft failures from other forms of interference. In 1972, a Hughes satellite experienced an upset where the communication with the satellite was lost for 96 seconds and then recaptured. Scientists Dr. Edward C. Smith, Al Holman, and Dr. Dan Binder explained the anomaly as a single-event upset (SEU) and published the first SEU paper in the IEEE Transactions on Nuclear Science journal in 1975. In 1978, the first evidence of soft errors from alpha particles in packaging materials was described by Timothy C. May and M.H. Woods. In 1979, James Ziegler of IBM, along with W. Lanford of Yale, first described the mechanism whereby a sea-level cosmic ray could cause a single-event upset in electronics. 1979 also saw the world's first heavy ion "single-event effects" test at a particle accelerator facility, conducted at Lawrence Berkeley National Laboratory's 88-Inch Cyclotron and Bevatron.

== Cause ==
Terrestrial SEUs arise due to cosmic particles colliding with atoms in the atmosphere, creating cascades or showers of neutrons and protons, which in turn may interact with electronic circuits. At deep sub-micron geometries, this affects semiconductor devices in the atmosphere.

In space, high-energy ionizing particles exist as part of the natural background, referred to as galactic cosmic rays (GCRs). Solar particle events and high-energy protons trapped in the Earth's magnetosphere (Van Allen radiation belts) exacerbate this problem. The high energies associated with the phenomenon in the space particle environment generally render increased spacecraft shielding useless in terms of eliminating SEUs and catastrophic single-event phenomena (e.g. destructive latch-up). Secondary atmospheric neutrons generated by cosmic rays can also have sufficiently high energy for producing SEUs in electronics on aircraft flights over the poles or at high altitudes. Trace amounts of radioactive elements in chip packages also lead to SEUs.

== Testing for SEU sensitivity ==
The sensitivity of a device to SEU can be empirically estimated by placing a test device in a particle stream at a cyclotron or other particle accelerator facility. This particular test methodology is especially useful for predicting the SER (soft error rate) in known space environments but can be problematic for estimating terrestrial SER from neutrons. In this case, a large number of parts must be evaluated, possibly at different altitudes, to find the actual rate of upset.

Another way to empirically estimate SEU tolerance is to use a chamber shielded from radiation, with a known radiation source, such as Caesium-137.

When testing microprocessors for SEU, the software used to exercise the device must also be evaluated to determine which sections of the device were activated when SEUs occurred.

== SEUs and circuit design ==
By definition, SEUs do not destroy the circuits involved, but they can cause errors. In space-based microprocessors, one of the most vulnerable portions is often the 1st and 2nd-level cache memories, because these must be very small and have very high speed, which means that they do not hold much charge. Often these caches are disabled if terrestrial designs are being configured to survive SEUs. Another point of vulnerability is the state machine in the microprocessor control, because of the risk of entering "dead" states (with no exits), however, these circuits must drive the entire processor, so they have relatively large transistors to provide relatively large electric currents and are not as vulnerable as one might think. Another vulnerable processor component is RAM, and more specifically static RAM (SRAM) used in cache memories. SRAM memories are usually designed with transistor sizes close to the minimum allowed by technology to allocate the maximum number of bits per unit area. Small transistor sizes and high bit density make memories one of the most susceptible components to SEUs. To ensure resilience to SEUs, often an error correcting memory is used, together with circuitry to periodically read (leading to correction) or scrub (if reading does not lead to correction) the memory of errors, before the errors overwhelm the error-correcting circuitry.

In digital and analog circuits, a single event may cause one or more voltages pulses (i.e. glitches) to propagate through the circuit, in which case it is referred to as a single-event transient (SET). Since the propagating pulse is not technically a change of "state" as in a memory SEU, one should differentiate between SET and SEU. If a SET propagates through digital circuitry and results in an incorrect value being latched in a sequential logic unit, it is then considered an SEU.

Hardware problems can also occur for related reasons. Under certain circumstances (of both circuit design, process design, and particle properties) a "parasitic" thyristor inherent to CMOS designs can be activated, effectively causing an apparent short-circuit from power to ground. This condition is referred to as latch-up, and in absence of constructional countermeasures, often destroys the device due to thermal runaway. Most manufacturers design to prevent latch-up and test their products to ensure that latch-up does not occur from atmospheric particle strikes. In order to prevent latch-up in space, epitaxial substrates, silicon on insulator (SOI) or silicon on sapphire (SOS) are often used to further reduce or eliminate the susceptibility.

== Notable SEUs ==
- Sun's UltraSPARC II processors manufactured between 1997 and 1999 had severe stability issues owing to their usage of radioactive IBM SRAM cache chips emitting alpha particles, causing regular single-event upsets triggering crashes across processes.
- In the 2003 elections in Brussels's municipality Schaerbeek (Belgium), an anomalous recorded number of votes triggered an investigation that concluded an SEU was responsible for giving a candidate named Maria Vindevoghel 4,096 extra votes. The possibility of a single-event upset is suggested by the difference in votes being equivalent to a power of two, 2^{12}.
- On October 7, 2008, Qantas Flight 72 at 37,000 feet, one of the plane's three air data inertial reference units had a failure, causing incorrect data to be sent to the plane's flight control systems. This caused pitch-downs and caused severe injuries to crew and passengers. All potential causes were found to be "unlikely", or "very unlikely", except for an SEU, whose likelihood could not be estimated.
- On October 30, 2025, a JetBlue plane made by Airbus suddenly and unexpectedly dropped altitude, resulting in several injuries and an emergency landing. Airbus concluded that the cause was a bit flip due to intense solar radiation or cosmic rays. 6,000 planes were grounded to receive a software update, which has the plane's software reset the data more frequently so that future incidents would not affect flight.

== See also ==
- Hamming distance
- Parity bit
- Gray code
- Libaw-Craig code
