= Paul Dressendorfer =

American nuclear physicist and photographer

Paul V. Dressendorfer is an American retired nuclear physicist.

Dressendorfer earned his bachelor's of science in physics at Caltech in 1972, then pursued graduate study in solid state physics at Yale University, completing a master's of science in 1973, a master of philosophy in 1974, and doctor of philosophy in 1978. He is a fellow of the IEEE. Dressendorfer retired from Sandia National Laboratories in 2007, and was editor in chief of the journal IEEE Transactions on Nuclear Science for 25 years, until Zane Bell took over in 2019. After retiring from his research career, Dressendorfer became an aerial photographer.
