= Parasitic structure =

Type of semiconductor device failure

In a semiconductor device, a parasitic structure is a portion of the device that resembles in structure some other, simpler semiconductor device, and causes the device to enter an unintended mode of operation when subjected to conditions outside of its normal range. For example, the internal structure of an NPN bipolar transistor resembles two P-N junction diodes connected together by a common anode. In normal operation the base-emitter junction does indeed form a diode, but in most cases it is undesirable for the base-collector junction to behave as a diode. If a sufficient forward bias is placed on this junction it will form a parasitic diode structure, and current will flow from base to collector.

A common parasitic structure is that of a silicon controlled rectifier (SCR). Once triggered, an SCR conducts for as long as there is a current, necessitating a complete power-down to reset the behavior of the device. This condition is known as latchup.
