= Institute for Space and Defense Electronics =

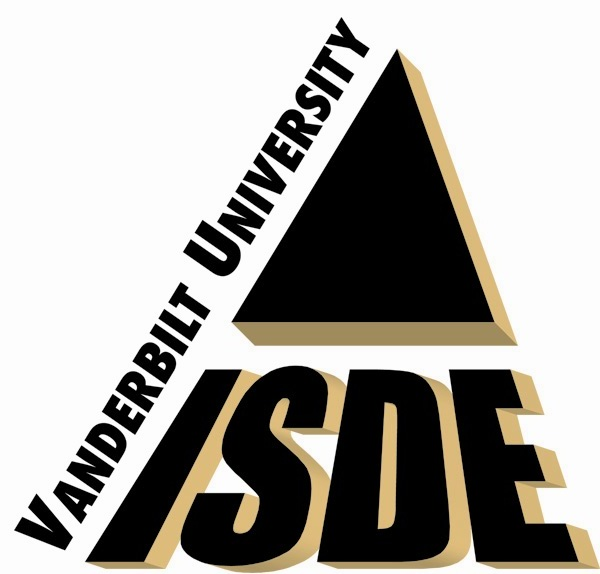
- Established: 2003
- Affiliations: Vanderbilt University
- Endowment: US$ 8 million(2011-12)
- Director: Mike Alles
- Academic staff: 23
- Administrative staff: 3
- Location: Nashville, TN, USA
- Website: http://isde.vanderbilt.edu

The Institute for Space and Defense Electronics (ISDE) is a research facility at Vanderbilt University, a private research university in Nashville, Tennessee. The ISDE is housed in the Department of Electrical Engineering and Computer Science and it is the largest such academic facility in the world.

== Objective ==
The mission of ISDE is to contribute to the design and analysis of radiation-hardened electronics, the development of test methods and plans for assuring radiation hardness, and the development of solutions to system-specific problems related to radiation effects. ISDE was launched with initial support from the US Navy SSPO and Draper Labs. In addition, ISDE currently supports the Defense Threat Reduction Agency, Arnold Engineering Development Center, NASA Goddard Space Flight Center, Mission Research Corporation, Boeing/DARPA and BAE Systems. ISDE engineers help to identify radiation related issues at the device and circuit levels, propose design solutions and implement test plans. Expertise includes, but is not limited to, Interrail, Honeywell and IBM processes.

== History ==
The Radiation Effects Group (RER) at Vanderbilt University was established in 2003 and is the largest program of its kind in the U.S. It is the only academic program actively involved in supporting the Department of Defense (DOD) in radiation effects for strategic applications, and one of very few programs involved in microelectronics research for space applications. In January 2003, the Radiation Effects Group established the Institute for Space and Defense Electronics (ISDE) in order to extend its capabilities to serve government and commercial customers.

== Facilities ==
The ISDE facility is located off of the Vanderbilt University campus and is said to offer an office environment for engineering and project management activities. The institute has full access to the university's laboratories and meeting facilities located on Vanderbilt's campus. The ISDE office is described as a 'secure, limited-access facility', allowing only approved personnel to enter without an ISDE employee escort.

== Capabilities ==
The engineering staff of ISDE performs design, analysis and modeling work for a variety of space and defense-oriented organizations. ISDE engineers help to identify radiation-related issues at the device and circuit levels, propose design solutions, and implement test plans. ISDE has an array of software tools for simulating radiation effects and designing integrated circuits, a high performance parallel computing cluster (ACCRE), several types of radiation sources, and extensive electrical characterization capability. Specifically, ISDE has an extensive suite of test and characterization equipment for radiation-effects analysis, including an ARACOR 10-keV x-ray irradiator, two Cs-137 isotopic irradiators, a state-of-the-art 2 MV Peloton Facility capable of 4 MeV protons, 6 MeV alphas, 14 MeV oxygen and 16 MeV chlorine ions, a Class IV Laser Test Facility etc. ISDE team members have extensive experience conducting single-event tests at facilities including Brookhaven National Laboratory, Lawrence Berkeley National Laboratory, Los Alamos National Laboratory, TRIUMF, Sandia National Laboratories etc.

An array of test equipment is available to facilitate the characterization of irradiated devices and ICs. Vanderbilt also has in place a cooperative research and development agreement (CRADA) with NAVSEA-Crane that provides access to a suite of radiation sources and fully equipped parts analysis laboratory. Vanderbilt's Advanced Computing Center for Research and Education (ACCRE) houses VAMPIRE, an 1800+ processor Beowulf cluster supercomputer used to execute Vanderbilt's Technology Computer Aided Design (TCAD) suite and the particle interaction simulator based on Geant4.

== Radiation-Effects Group sponsors ==
The institute gets funding from various government and private sector sources. Some of them are:

- US Navy Strategic Systems Program Office
- NAVSEA-Crane
- Air Force Office of Scientific Research
- Defense Threat Reduction Agency
- DARPA
- NASA – GSFC, MSFC, JSFC and JPL
- Sandia National Labs
- BAE Systems
- Boeing
- Cisco Systems
- Broadcom
- Charles Stark Draper Laboratory
