= Cleret =

American squeegee manufacturer

- Type: Private
- Industry: Cleaning
- Founded: 1987
- Founder: Ala
- Headquarters: Lake Oswego, Oregon, USA
- Website: cleret.com

The original Cleret squeegee (1989), in the permanent collection of the Smithsonian Institution.

Cleret is an American manufacturer and brand of squeegees and related products based in Lake Oswego, Oregon. The company's original squeegee won an International Design Excellence Award from the Industrial Designers Society of America, and sits in the permanent collection of the Smithsonian Institution.

== History ==
Hanco Inc. was founded in 1987 by Alan Hansen in Lake Oswego, Oregon, to manufacture Cleret squeegees. The company name was later changed to Cleret.

Hansen began designing the Cleret squeegee in 1986. At the time, he was director of corporate audit at Nike, Inc., and at Louisiana Pacific Corporation before that. After two years of working on concepts for a more attractive squeegee, Hansen hired Beaverton, Oregon-based Ziba Design, founded by Sohrab Vossoughi in 1984. Hansen invested $10,000 of his own money to pay Ziba to design what would become the Cleret Glass Cleaner. The brand name Cleret is derived from "clear-it" and is intended to sound upscale.

The company generated $14,000 in sales in 1989, and over $1 million in its first year officially on the market, with 80% of sales coming from high-end catalogs such as Hammacher Schlemmer. It had annual revenues of $16 million by its second year on the market. In 1990, Hansen moved Hanco out of his home and into an office at the Water Tower in Portland's Johns Landing neighborhood. Around that time, Hansen quit his job at Nike to focus on building Cleret, continuing to manage and design new products for the company. In 1991, Cleret expanded beyond the United States, as it was introduced in Canada, Europe and Japan.

In 1989, while it was still a prototype, the squeegee was one of 12 products to win an Industrial Design Excellence Award from the Industrial Designers Society of America. The squeegee was sold at the gift shop of the Museum of Modern Art in New York City. In 1997, the original Cleret squeegee from 1989 would join the permanent collection of the Smithsonian Institution as a part of its Product Design and Decorative Arts collection.

== Products and design ==
Ziba's designers determined that the traditional T-shape of a squeegee was not the most efficient for a wiping motion in a confined area such as a shower stall. After researching the way window washers and filling-station attendants would put their hands close to the blade and rarely use the handle, Ziba designed a plastic squeegee without a traditional handle; instead, it had a tubular rubber grip running parallel to curved twin blades, which moves across glass or mirrors with a wiping motion to reduce strain to the hand and wrist. The dual blades leave a surface cleaner than a single blade squeegee.

The New York Times called the resulting product "a piece of functional art" and "an elegant product" with a "sensual design". The Oregonian wrote that it "looks like no other squeegee in history". Reviewers have lauded it for being easy to hold and for standing on its end for simple storage.

Cleret products are manufactured and assembled entirely in Oregon. The company later expanded beyond shower squeegees to manufacture squeegees for windows, kitchens, patio doors and automobiles.

== Honors and awards ==
- International Design Excellence Award (Gold), Industrial Designers Society of America, 1989
- Smithsonian Institution permanent collection, Product Design and Decorative Arts, acquired 1997
