= 2006 Industrial Design Excellence Awards =

The Industrial Design Excellence Awards is a program sponsored by BusinessWeek and the Industrial Designers Society of America ("IDSA"). These are the awards which were given out for 2006.

Return to main article:Industrial Design Excellence Awards

== Business & Industrial Products ==
=== Gold Winners ===
1. ResQTec hydraulic rescue tools (Credit:VanBerloStudio's B.V., Netherlands)

=== Silver Winners ===
1. Crown TSP6000 Turret Stockpicker (Credit:Crown Equipment Corp., Formation Design Group, Ergonomic Systems Design, Inc., Substance Design Group Ltd., and Design Central, USA)
2. Crinia (Credit:Design + Industry Pty Limited, Australia)
3. Surveillance Dome Camera WV-CS954 (Credit:Panasonic Design Company, Japan)
4. Pocket Imager (SP-P300MK) (Credit:Samsung Electronics, Korea)

=== Bronze Winners ===
1. CT-80 Explosive Detection System (Credit:Martin Steven Linder Design, USA)
2. Memory Card Camera-Recorder DVC PRO HD P2 Handheld AG-HVX200 (Credit:Panasonic Design Company, Japan)
3. The Jobclock (Credit:Stuart Karten Design, USA)

== Computer Equipment ==
=== Gold Winners ===
1. Talking Tactile Tablet (TTT) (Credit:Touch Graphics, Inc., USA)
2. Lenovo Opti Desktop PC (Credit:ZIBA Design, Inc. and Lenovo Group Limited, China)

=== Silver Winners ===
1. Laptop Mobility Cart (Credit:Bretford, USA)
2. SanDisk Ultra II SD PLUS (Credit:Lunar Design and SanDisk, USA)
3. AMD Personal Internet Communicator (PIC) (Credit:M3 Design, USA)
4. DX1 Input System (Credit:Summit ID and Productiv, USA)

== Consumer Products ==
=== Gold Winners ===
1. SignalOne Safety Vocal Smoke Detector (VSD) (Credit:Bresslergroup and SignalOne Safety f/k/a Kidsmart, USA)
2. 2SECONDS QUECHUA (Credit:DECATHLON, France)
3. KODAK EASYSHARE V570 Dual Lens Digital Camera (Credit:Eastman Kodak Company and blueMap design, USA)
4. DXL Protective Helmet (Credit:fuseproject, Pulsium Engineering, and Pryde Group, USA)
5. Wall Mounted Digital Projector (AN110) (Credit:LG Electronics Inc., Korea)
6. Washing and Drying Machine NA-VR1000 (Credit:Panasonic Design Company, Japan)
7. Eva Solo Tea-maker (Credit:Tools Design, Denmark)
8. Little Wing (Credit:Warren Light Craft LLC, USA)

=== Silver Winners ===
1. L'Amour collection (Credit:Nokia Design, Great Britain, Nokia Design, Finland, and Nokia Design, USA)
2. A/Design Bowl (Credit:designafairs and Fielitz GmbH Leichtbauelemente, Germany)
3. KODAK EASYSHARE-ONE Zoom Digital Camera (Credit:Eastman Kodak Company and blueMap design, USA)
4. Shure E4 Sound Isolation Earphones (Credit:Essential Inc. and Shure Inc., USA)
5. K2 Moxie Snow Helmet (Credit:One & Co, City Electric, and K2 Corporation, USA)
6. Refrigerator NR-P550T (Credit:Panasonic Design Company, USA)
7. HDR-HC1 (Credit:Sony Corporation, Japan)
8. Timberland PreciseFit System (Credit:The Timberland Company, USA)
9. Solo (Credit:asa designers limited and Arcam Limited, Great Britain)

=== Bronze Winners ===
1. The BikeBoard Product Line (Credit:Davison, Inc. and The BikeBoard Company, LLC, USA)
2. X-BASE TRIBORD (Credit:Decathlon, France)
3. Oval Light Dispenser Flashlight (Credit:Gelb Design, FLLC, USA)
4. Kenjo Ryoko (Credit:Karim Rashid Inc., USA)
5. KARI, ARI, ARIM, RIM (Credit:Karim Rashid Inc., USA)
6. Mion Footwear (Credit:Keen Design Studio and Timberland Invention Factory, USA)
7. WaterTile (Credit:Kohler Co., USA)
8. Sushi Time Sushi Plate (Credit:Mint Inc., USA)
9. Motorola and Burton Audex Jacket Series (Credit:Mobile Device Business, Motorola, USA)
10. Cupsicle 8oz. Insulated My First Straw Cup (Credit:Munchkin, Inc., USA)
11. Battery Size-Free Flash Light BF-104 (Credit:Panasonic Design Company, Japan)
12. Household Fuel Cell Cogeneration System (Credit:Panasonic Design Company, Japan)
13. O3 Engineered Tennis Racquets (Credit:Prince Sports srl, Italy)

== Design Explorations ==
=== Gold Winners ===
1. Touch Messenger (Credit:Samsung Design China, Korea, Samsung Design China, China, Samsung Design China, USA)
2. Intelligent Energy ENV Bike (Credit:Seymourpowell and Intelligent Energy, Great Britain)

=== Silver Winners ===
1. BRP EXIT Concept (Credit:BRP Design Team, Canada)
2. Chrysler AKINO (Credit:DaimlerChryslerPacifica, USA)
3. The Hover Creeper (Credit:Davison Design & Development, Inc. and Whiteside Manufacturing Company, Inc., USA)
4. Hundred Dollar Laptop Computer (Credit:Design Continuum, USA)
5. Safe-Vent Syringe Venting System (Credit:Formation Design Group, USA)
6. Samsung Portable Digital Projector (Credit:Teague and Samsung Electronics, USA)

=== Bronze Winners ===
1. Nutty Buddy (Credit:Arizona State University, USA)
2. Home Cinema II (Credit:Hewlett Packard and Pix Interactive, USA)
3. Accuray Next Generation CyberKnife Concept Investigation with Robotic Patient Positioner Couch (RPPC) (Credit:Lunar Design and Accuray, USA)
4. Cocoon - disaster relief shelters (Credit:NewDealDesign, USA)
5. Bumpbrella Concept Umbrella (Credit:RKS Design, USA)
6. Luna: Light + Air Door (Credit:seven02 design, LLC, USA)
7. Ondomusic (Credit:Ondo Creation Limited, Hong Kong)
8. Sun Family (Alloy) (Credit:Sun Microsystems User Centered Design Group, Sun Microsystems and montgomerypfeifer, inc., USA)

== Design Strategy ==
=== Gold Winners ===
1. Sirius S-50 Design Strategy (Credit:ZIBA Design, Inc. and Sirius Satellite Radio)

=== Bronze Winners ===
1. South Waterfront Design Strategy (Credit:Gerding Edlen Development Company, LLC, Williams & Dame Development, ZIBA Design, Inc., Val Taylor Smith and Randy Poulsen, USA)
2. Netgear Platinum II design language (Credit:NewDealDesign, USA)

== Ecodesign ==
=== Gold Winners ===
1. SIM from Tricycle (Credit:Tricycle Inc., USA)

=== Silver Winners ===
1. Zody (Credit:Haworth Inc. and ITO - Design, USA)

=== Bronze Winners ===
1. Celle Task Chair (Credit:Jerome Caruso Design, USA)
2. Mion Footwear (Credit:Keen Design Studio and Timberland Invention Factory, USA)

== Environments ==
=== Gold Winners ===
1. Construction Fence (Credit:DUCK IMAGE CO., LTD., USA)
2. Ashes and Snow - The Nomadic Museum (Credit:Gensler, Shigeru Ban Architects, France, and Officina Di Architettura, Italy)
3. Bloomberg L.P. Corporate Headquarters (Credit:Pentagram Design, USA)

=== Silver Winners ===
1. Voyage + mini Voyage (Credit:fuseproject and Hammers Nagel Engineering, Germany)
2. [Marmol Radziner Prefab] (Credit:Marmol Radziner + Associates, Green Dragon Office, Tryarc LLC, Greg Steinberg and Robin Cottle Design, USA)

=== Bronze Winners ===
1. Outdoor Information Carts (Credit:34th Street Partnership)
2. Help Point Intercom (Credit:Antenna Design New York Inc. and MTA/New York City Transit Team, USA)
3. Nosy Parker (Credit:Antenna Design New York Inc., USA)

== Furniture ==
=== Gold Winners ===
1. THINK (Credit:Glen Oliver Loew Industrial Design, Germany, and Steelcase Inc., USA)
2. CityWing (Credit:Philips Design, Netherlands)

=== Silver Winners ===
1. Duo shower curtain rod (Credit:Robyn Kaminski, IDSA, USA)
2. COCOON (Credit:UONO, Germany)

=== Bronze Winners ===
1. Belkin/Ameriwood Grommet Hub (Credit:Belkin IDG and Ameriwood Industries, USA)
2. Liberty Chair (Credit:Niels Diffrient Product Design, Shea + Latone, Elizabeth Whelan Textile Design, and mmckenna, LLC, USA)

== Medical & Scientific Products ==
=== Gold Winners ===
1. Cybertech MAT Mechanical Advantage Tourniquet (Credit:Cybertech Medical and Ewing Design Group, USA)
2. Insulet Omnipod Personal Diabetes Management System (Credit:Design Continuum, USA)
3. Siemens Symbia Medical Imaging Systems (Credit:Siemens Medical Systems, Formation Design Group, designafairs, Germany, and Ergonomic Systems Design, USA)

=== Silver Winners ===
1. SuturTek 360° Fascia Closure Device (Credit:Bleck Design Group and SuturTek, USA)
2. Smiths Cleo 90 Infusion Set (Credit:Bridge Design and Smiths Medical MD, Inc, USA)
3. Echelon60 ENDOPATH (Credit:Stapler Ethicon Endo-Surgery and Design Science, USA)
4. 3D Mouse (Credit:GE Healthcare, USA)
5. At Home Neuromotor Test Device (Credit:Intel Corporation, USA)
6. Quantum Design SVSM (Credit:Strategix Vision Inc., USA)

=== Bronze Winners ===
1. FirstDefender Handheld Raman Spectrometer (Credit:Altitude, Inc, USA)
2. Titan Electron Microscope (Credit:Philips Design, Netherlands)
3. da Vinci S - Surgical System (Credit:rsid studio, USA)
4. SonoSite MicroMaxx Ultrasound System (Credit:SonoSite, USA)

== Packaging & Graphics ==
=== Gold Winners ===
1. Pluma (Credit:Brandia Central, Portugal)

=== Silver Winners ===
1. Cepheid Reagent Beads Dispenser (Credit:bioDesign and Cepheid Inc., USA)

== Research ==
=== Gold Winners ===
1. Lenovo Visioneering (Credit:ZIBA Design, Inc. and Lenovo Group Limited, China)

=== Silver Winners ===
1. Time Empowerment Research (Credit:Stuart Karten Design, USA)

== Student Designs ==
=== Gold Winners ===
1. The MIN.CHAIR (Credit:Chul Min Kang, USA)
2. CityBike Amsterdam (Credit:Jonathan Abarbanel, USA)

=== Silver Winners ===
1. PLUG-IN (Credit:Julia Burke, IDSA, USA)
2. Terraform (Credit:Robert Moser, USA)
3. S.I.E.C. Car Seat (Credit:Sam Chiu, Hiro Ikuma, Tim Meyer, and Ai Su, USA)

=== Bronze Winners ===
1. Airwash (Credit:Gabriel Tan and Wendy Chua, Singapore)
2. E - rope (Credit:Chul Min Kang, Miju Kim, and Sung Hun Lim, USA)
3. ReFA Disaster Relief Field Bed (Credit:Luisa F. Ruge, USA)

== Transportation ==
=== Silver Winners ===
1. BRP, Sea-Doo, Challenger 180 (Credit:BRP Design Team, Canada)

=== Bronze Winners ===
1. CAMCOPTER S-100 (Credit:heufler design, Austria)

== Sources ==
- BusinessWeek IDEA06 Showcase
