= Stephen Pevnick =

American interdisciplinary artist (born 1944)

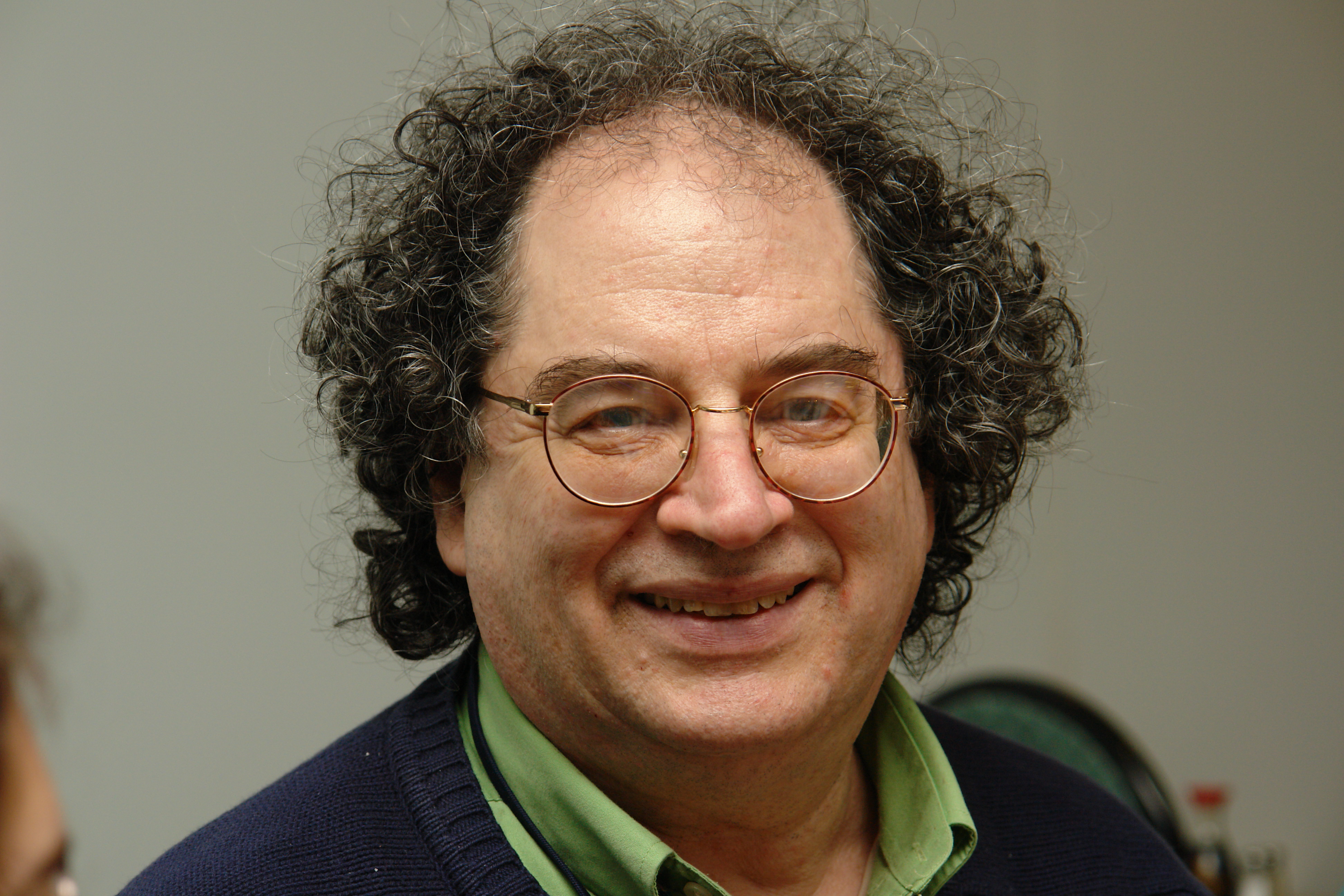
- Stephen Pevnick in Milwaukee
- Born: 1944; Milwaukee
- Known for: new media
- Notable work: Graphical Waterfall

Stephen Pevnick (born 1944) is an American interdisciplinary artist who works in a variety of media, including interactive art, public art, permanent installations, and installations for the trade show industry. He is currently a Professor of Art at the University of Wisconsin–Milwaukee.

== Education ==
Pevnick earned his BA in Design at Southern Illinois University Carbondale, and went on to earn a MFA in Multimedia and Sculpture from Washington University in St. Louis. He began his teaching career at the University of South Florida in 1972 and moved to Milwaukee and the University of Wisconsin–Milwaukee in 1978.

== Development of the Graphical Waterfall ==
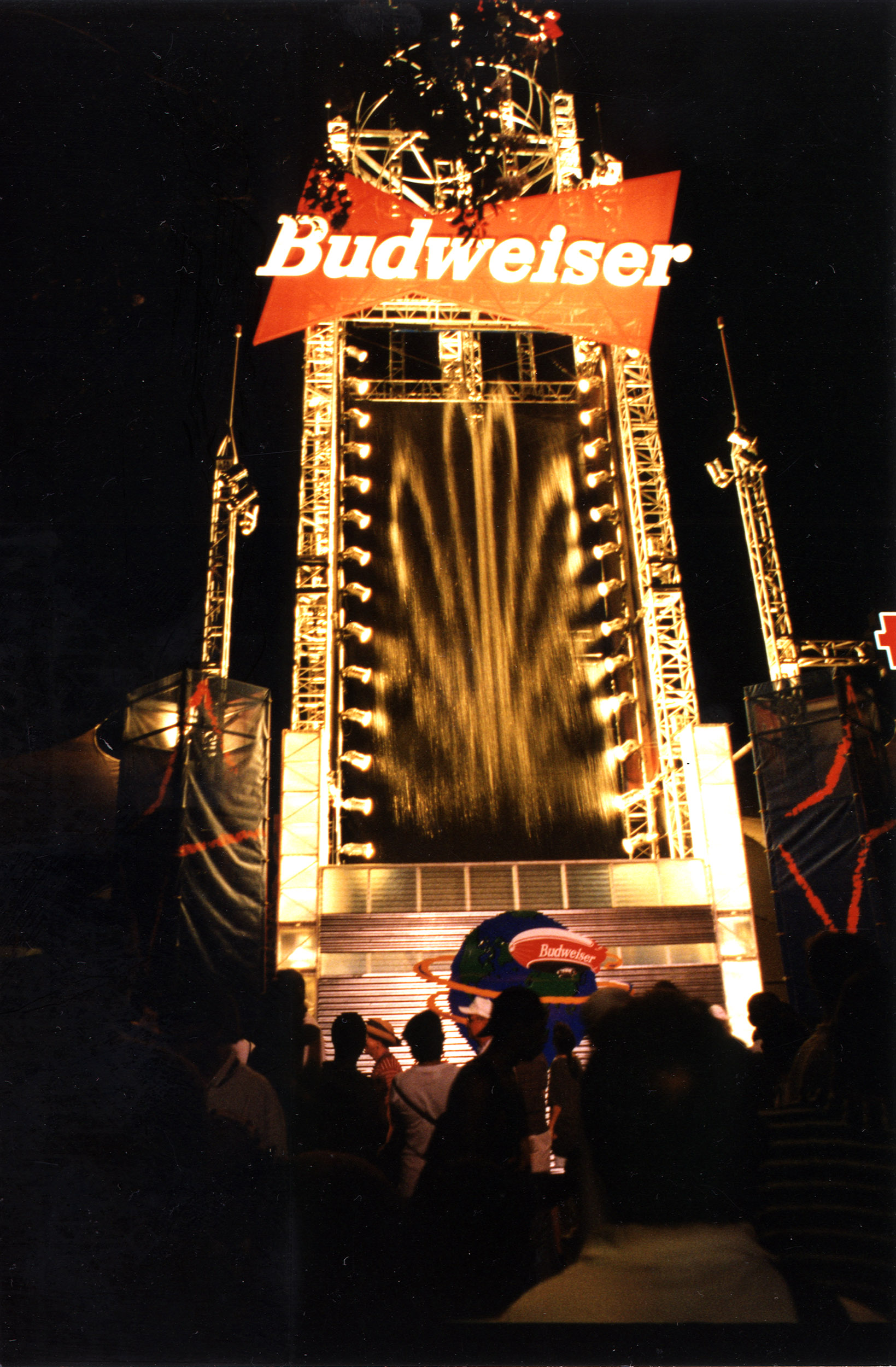
Graphical Waterfall at the Olympics, 1996

In 1974 Pevnick received a grant from the University of South Florida to explore the idea of forming graphics in free falling water droplet images. In 1977 he produced the first three-dimensional computer-controlled waterfall image, a falling diamond, on a machine which would evolve into today's Graphical Waterfall. The valve system was a horizontal square, 4 feet by 4 feet, and had an 8 nozzle by 8 nozzle grid totaling 64 nozzles. Pevnick received a patent for a "program controllable free falling water drop fountain" in 1981. In 1980 and 1984 he received project fellowships from the National Endowment for the Arts and in 1983 he won one of 10 Industrial Design Excellence Awards from the Industrial Designers Society of America for the design of a one-foot square 576 nozzle modular valve and of a matrix of 4 valves together. In 1988 the first Graphical Waterfall was displayed at the International Art Exhibition, Navy Pier in Chicago.

== Notable displays and exhibitions ==
The most notable displays have been a 24 ft. wide Graphical Waterfall shown for Jeep at the North American International Auto Show in Detroit, Michigan in the years 2000 - 2008 and featured on YouTube; a 24 ft. wide Graphical Waterfall shown for the King of Thailand’s 60th anniversary of his ascension to the throne in 2006 in Bangkok and a 12 ft. wide by 50 ft. tall Graphical Waterfall displayed for Anheuser-Busch at Centennial Olympic Park for the Summer Olympics in Atlanta in 1996.

The first permanent installation of a Graphical Waterfall was in 2008 in the Oakland Shopping Center in Guatemala City, Guatemala.

== Current work ==
Pevnick's current research centers around real-time multimedia and computer-controlled kinetic sculpture and water.
