= Stencil printing =

Printed circuit board solder process

Stencil printing is the process of depositing solder paste on the printed circuit boards (PCBs) to establish electrical connections. It is immediately followed by the component placement stage. The equipment and materials used in this stage are a stencil, solder paste, and a printer.

The stencil printing function is achieved through a single material namely solder paste which consists of solder metal and flux. Paste also acts as an adhesive during component placement and solder reflow. The tackiness of the paste enables the components to stay in place. A good solder joint is one where the solder paste has melted well and flowed and wetted the lead or terminal on the component and the pad on the board.

In order to achieve this kind of a solder joint, the component needs to be in the right place, the right volume of solder paste needs to be applied, the paste needs to wet well on the board and component, and there needs to be a residue that is either safe to leave on the board or one that can easily be cleaned.

The solder volume is a function of the stencil, the printing process and equipment, solder powder, and rheology or the physical properties of the paste. Good solder wetting is a function of the flux.

== Inputs ==
Inputs to the process can be classified as design input, material input and process parameter input. The output of the process is a printed wiring board that meets the process specification limits. These specifications usually are consistent solder paste volume and height, and printed solder paste aligned on the PWB pads. This determines the process yield.

In electronic design automation, the solder paste mask and thus the stencil is typically defined in a layer named tCream/bCream aka CRC/CRS, (Note: The letters 'C' and 'S' in EAGLE's old Gerber filename extensions .CRC/.CRS for the top and bottom cream frame layers have their origin in times when printed circuit boards were typically equipped with through-hole components populated on one side of the board only, the so called "component side" (top) versus the "solder side" (bottom) where these components were soldered.) PMC/PMS, TPS/BPS, or TSP/BSP (EAGLE), F.Paste/B.Paste (KiCad), PasteTop/PasteBot (TARGET), SPT/SPB (OrCAD), PT.PHO/PB.PHO (PADS), PASTE-VS/PASTE-RS (WEdirekt), GTP/GBP (Gerber and many others). Some (less common) EDA software does not treat the solder paste mask as a regular part of a PCB's layer stack, in which case the paste mask must be derived from the solder stop mask.

For improved accuracy, stencils traditionally were often mounted in proprietary aluminum frames of various kinds. Today, the usage of quick mount systems is more common at least for low volume batches, mounting the stencil pneumatically or mechanically. For this the stencil needs additional perforations for alignment following one of several mount system standards including QuattroFlex, ZelFlex, ESSEMTEC, PAGGEN, Metz, DEK VectorGuard, Mechatronic Systems and others.

== Printing process ==
The process begins with loading the board into the printer. The internal vision system aligns the stencil to the board, after which the squeegee prints the solder paste. The stencil and board are then separated and unloaded. The bottom of the stencil is wiped about every ten prints to remove excess solder paste remaining on the stencil.

A typical printing operation has a speed of around 15 to 45 seconds per board. Print head speed is typically 1 to 8 inches per second. The printing process must be carefully controlled. Misalignment of motion from the reference results in several defects, hence the board must be secured correctly before the process begins. A snugger and vacuum holders are used to secure the X and Y axes of the board. Vacuum holders must be carefully used, as they may affect the pin-in-paste printing process if not secured properly.

The longest process is the printing operation, followed by the separation process. Post print inspection is crucial and is usually performed with special 2D vision systems on the printer or separate 3D systems.

=== Printed wiring boards ===
==== Design ====
Vision systems in the stencil printing machines use global fiducial marks for aligning the PWB. Without these fiducials the printer would not print the solder paste in exact alignment with the pads. The PWB should have close dimensional tolerances so that it mates to the stencil. This is necessary to achieve the required alignment of solder blocks on the pads.

==== Masking ====
The required accuracy in alignment can also be achieved by controlling the flow of solder on the PWB during reflow soldering. For this purpose, the space between the pads is often coated with a solder mask. The solder mask materials have no affinity to the molten solder and hence, no positive bonding is formed between them as the solder solidifies. This process is often referred to as solder masking. The mask must be aligned correctly. The mask protects the PWB against oxidation, and prevents unintended solder bridges from forming between closely spaced solder pads.

Also the height of the solder mask should be lower than the pad height to avoid gasketing problems. If the height of the solder mask is greater than that of the pad, then some of the solder paste would settle in the empty space between the mask and the pad. This is what is referred to as gasketing. It is a seal that fills the space between two surfaces to prevent leakages. Gasketing is a problem as the excess solder paste around the pad may be more than a nuisance factor for circuits having very small line spacing.

==== Finishing ====
The pads on the PWB are made of copper and are susceptible to oxidization. Surface oxidization on the copper will inhibit the ability of the solder to form a reliable joint. To avoid this unwanted effect, all exposed copper is protected with a surface finish.

=== Aperture fill and release ===
The core of a well printed PWB lies in the fill and release of solder paste into the aperture. When the stencil is in contact with the PWB, solder paste is applied over the top surface of the stencil using a squeegee. This causes the aperture to fill with solder paste. The PWB is then lowered from the stencil. The amount of solder paste which is released from the stencil apertures and transferred to the PWB pads, determines whether or not the print is good. Ideally, all volumes of solder paste should be equal to the volume of the corresponding stencil aperture. In reality however, this is never the case. Hence, a print is considered to be good if a certain fraction of the paste is released. One way of quantifying print performance is to calculate the transfer efficiency. This is mathematically stated as:

Transfer efficiency = (Volume of printed deposit) / (Theoretical maximum volume)

In the above expression, the theoretical maximum volume is simply the open volume of the stencil aperture. Ideally, a transfer efficiency of 1 is desired. In reality however, greater the transfer efficiency, better is the print. Now in order to get the aperture full of paste requires sufficient flow rate and sufficient fill time. Apertures which are not completely filled will not release paste onto the board, which results in clogged stencils and defective solder joints. Solder paste release is determined by the separation speed of the board from the stencil. The adhesion of the paste to the board has to provide the shearing force to overcome the adhesion of the paste to the stencil walls. This hydrodynamic shearing force depends on the separation speed.

=== Stencils ===
Stencils are used to print solder paste on the PCB. They are often made of stainless steel or nickel and are manufactured by different processes described below.

==== Manufacturing processes ====
===== Laser cutting =====
The use of laser technology allows having tighter tolerances and greater accuracy.

The aperture walls can be smoothed through electro-polishing and/or nickel plating. The laser cutting process results in trapezoidal apertures that can create better solder paste release characteristics.

The repeatability of dimensions in laser-cut stencils is generally better than that of chemical etching. With laser cutting, there are no photo films requiring precise alignment or protection from moisture.

===== E-FAB stencil =====
This stencil is formed by the process of electroforming nickel, hence the name E-FAB. The nickel has better wear characteristics than steel and electroforming creates smooth tapered aperture walls. The process also creates a ridge along the bottom of the stencil that can improve stencil-to-board gasketing and result in more consistent solder paste release.

==== Stencil design ====
Due to the need for fine pitch components, as the size of the aperture becomes smaller and smaller, they become “tall-narrow” apertures. In such cases, the apertures may be filled with solder paste but not completely released, or sometimes not even completely filled and hence get no deposits. In order to counter this problem, aperture walls are made as smooth as possible. Also, molecular layer nano coatings are put on the stencil walls so that the solder paste does not stick. Consistent fill and release is the most important output of stencil printing. When the stencil is down on the board, paste is filling the aperture and it's in contact with the pad and walls of the stencil. The contact is judged by taking the ratio of these areas i.e. the ratio of the area of the pad to the area of the walls. This is called area ratio. The information about the standards for stencil design is available at IPC Specification 7525 and other standards. In general, including stencils with tall and narrow apertures, an area ratio greater than 0.66 is recommended.

Illustrations of the various dimensions:

Pitch	Pad width	Aperture	Stencil thickness	Aspect ratio
25	15	12	6	2.0
20	12	9–10	5–6	1.7
15	10	7–8	5	1.4
12	8	5–6	4–5	1.2

For fine pitch stencils (smaller 20 mils pitch, 10 mils aperture), even with a 5 mils stencil, which is the most commonly used stencil thickness, the area ratio is below 1.5. This necessitates the use of a thinner stencil. For BGA/CSP and other very small apertures, the area ratio is used. It should be greater than 0.66, as this ensures a high probability of good fill and release. An area ratio below 0.66 would mean a much less reliable process.

Examples of area ratios for BGAs:

BGA	Pad	Aperture	Thickness	Area ratio
60 mil	32	30	6–8	1.25 – 0.94
50 mil	25	22	6–8	0.92 – 0.69
20 mil	12	10	5–6	0.50 – 0.42

Aperture size should be smaller than the pad size to avoid the excess solder paste or production of solder balls. A 10 to 20% reduction in aperture size as compared to the pad size is typical to minimize solder balls. Solder balls can result in malfunctioning of the electric circuit.

==== Other considerations ====
===== Step down stencils =====
A PCB may need varying amounts of solder paste to be applied depending upon the design and size of components. Applying a uniform maximum level of solder may not be a good solution in this case, as these stencils often find use when "pin and paste" technology (i.e., printing solder paste into through-holes to avoid wave soldering) and components of significantly different pitch are used in the same PWB. For this purpose, to achieve a varying solder amount, step down stencils are used.

===== Solder paste stencil life =====
Ideally, a solder paste should have, at minimum, a 4-hour stencil life. The stencil life is defined as a time period in which there will be no significant change in the solder paste material characteristics. A solder paste with a longer stencil life will be more robust in the printing process. Actual stencil life for a paste should be determined from the manufacturers' specifications and on-site verification.

===== Handling and storage of stencils =====
To improve the life and performance of stencils, they must be cleaned after use by removing any solder paste on them or within the apertures. The cleaned stencils are stored away in a protective area. Before usage, stencils are inspected for wear or damage. Stencils are typically identified by job numbers to reduce the risk of mishandling or misplacing.

=== Squeegee ===
Squeegees are used to spread solder over the stencil and to fill all apertures consistently. Squeegees come in two different types based either on metal or polyurethane. Metal squeegees are preferred over polyurethane. They produce very consistent solder volumes and are resistant to scooping the solder paste out of the apertures when printing. In addition, they have better wear characteristics, leading to longer life.

=== Common difficulties ===
==== Insufficient solder paste ====
Insufficient solder paste may cause poor bonds and contact between components and the board. The common causes of insufficient solder paste are poor gasketing, clogged stencil apertures, insufficient solder paste bead size, paste/stencil being used beyond recommended life span, stencil not wiped clean, or low squeegee pressure.

==== Smudging/bridging ====
The main causes of smudging/bridging are excessive squeegee pressure, inadequate stencil wiping, poor contact between the board and stencil, high temperature or humidity, or low solder paste viscosity.

==== Misalignment print ====
A typical misalignment print is usually caused by the vision system not spotting fiducials, PWB or stencil stretch, poor contact between the board and the stencil, or weak board support.

==== Bow and twist ====
A PCB not fixed properly during solder paste printing gives poor results and increases soldering related issues. Normally, solder paste printing equipment can handle warpage of 1.0 to 3.0 mm but beyond this limit needs some special jigs or fixtures to hold the PCB. It may be difficult to tackle thick and small boards compared to thin and bigger size boards.

== Statistical process control ==
More than 50% of defects in electronics assembly are due to solder paste printing problems. There are many parameters involved in this process, making it difficult to find the specific problem and to optimize the process. A careful statistical study of the process may be used to improve output significantly. The number of opportunities for a defect characterizes defects, not the actual number of defective parts.

Example:

If solder paste is printed on pads for a 68-pin QFP, then
Total number of opportunities for defects = 68 pins + 1 for the component = 69 possible defects for printing only.

Hence, there are 69 opportunities for defects to produce one defective component. Counting the defect opportunities is the most valid process monitor. Processes are typically rated in terms of number of defects per million opportunities (DPM). As an example, a process resulting in 100 defects when given 1 million defect opportunities would have a rating of 100 DPM. World class printing processes have defect levels around 20 DPM.

A low DPM printing process may be achieved by employing statistical techniques to determine the effects of individual parameters or interactions between different parameters. Important process parameters can then be optimized using design of experiments (DOE) techniques. These optimized parameters can then be implemented and process bench marking can begin. Statistical process control can then be used to continuously monitor and improve printing DPM levels.

== See also ==
- Stencil
- Pochoir
