= ModeMapping =

Research technique

ModeMapping is a research technique developed by Stuart Karten Design (SKD), a Los Angeles, United States, based industrial design firm. It is a method of interpreting standard consumer research to uncover areas of unmet needs.

It can be understood as a visualization tool that tracks the state of mind of consumers over time. Designers can then look for patterns by using a colorcoding system of categorizing these states of mind, or “modes,” that describe activity (“work mode” or “play mode”). The color-coded patterns of consumer behavior allow designers to look for shared experiences and then use these observations to suggest solutions that will appeal to customers. This also creates a topography of sorts of consumer activities as well as how they are thinking and feeling during those activities.

SKD has used ModeMapping to drive product lines for companies including Johnson Controls and Avery Dennison. For example, for Johnson Controls, SKD found that the drivers they observed all made quick, frequent transitions from role to role (parent at school, friend meeting peers at a restaurant) throughout the day. Seeing this pattern led the designers to suggest products such as a modular storage system that can easily be loaded into a vehicle and a reminder system (using RFID tags) that would alert drivers when important items weren’t brought into the car.

ModeMapping has won a Silver International Design Excellence Award in 2006.

BusinessWeek featured ModeMapping as an “innovation tool worth trying now.”
