= Pick-and-place machine =

Robotic machine

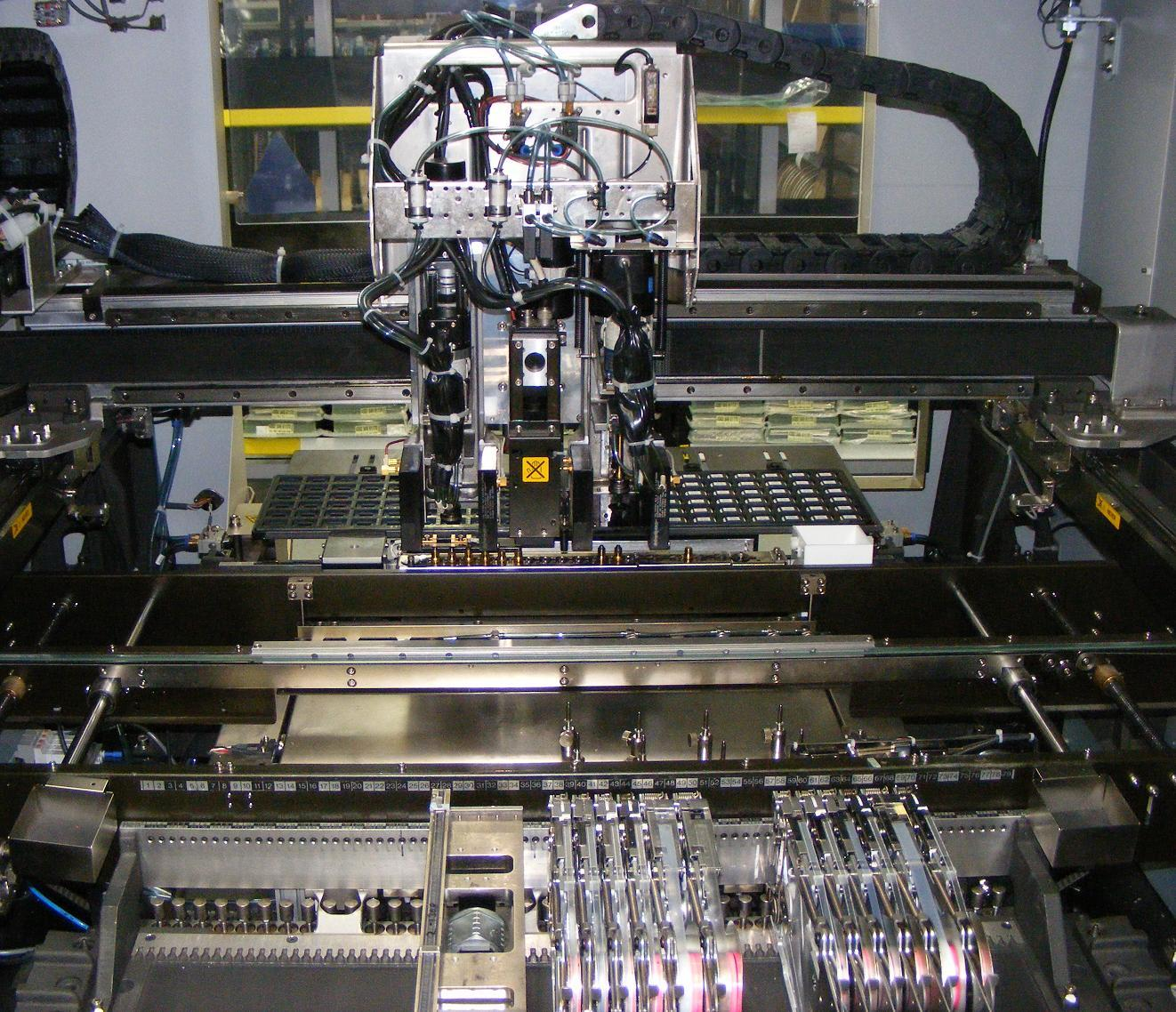
Internal details of a two head, gantry style pick-and-place JUKI SMT machine. In the foreground are tape and reel feeders, then the (currently empty) conveyor belt for printed circuit boards, and in back are large parts in a tray. The gantry carries two pickup nozzles, flanking a camera (marked "do not touch" to avoid fingerprints on the lens).

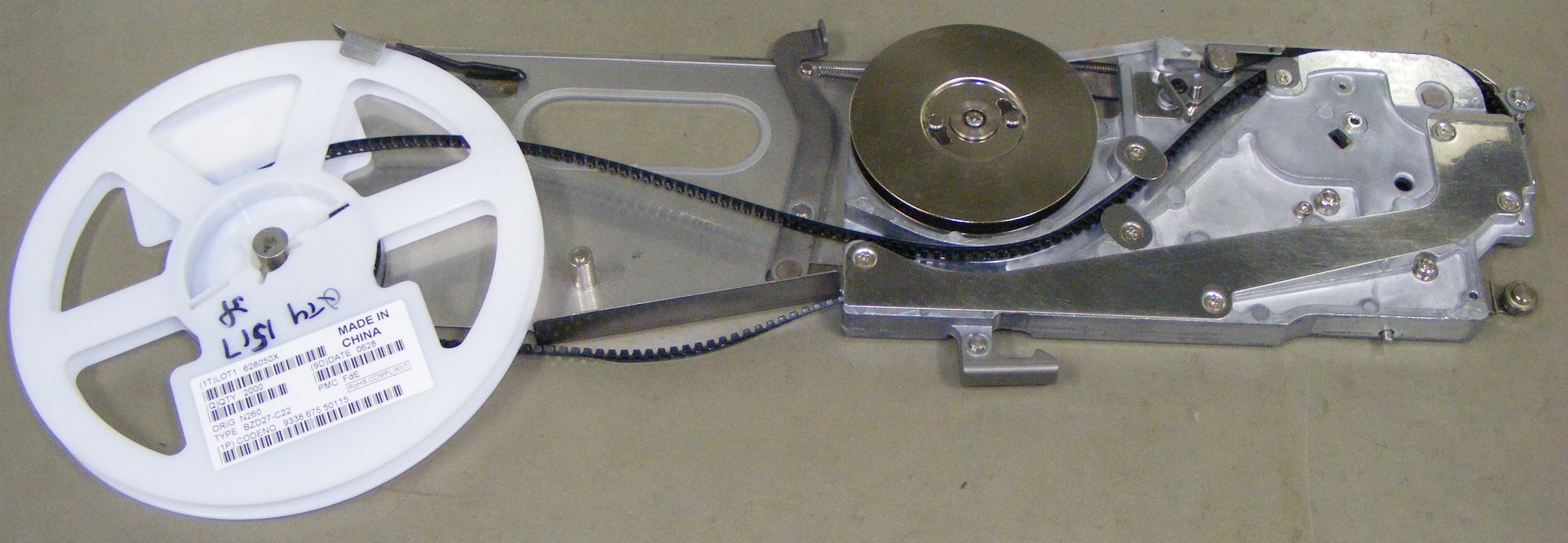
Tape-and-reel feed mechanism used to load components into a pick-and-place machine

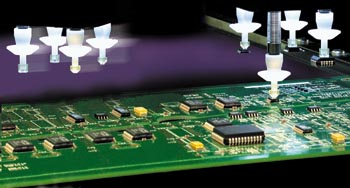
SMD pick-and-place machine (with simulated motion blurs)

Surface-mount technology (SMT) component placement systems, commonly called pick-and-place machines (PnP or P&P), are robotic machines which are used to place surface-mount devices (SMDs) onto a printed circuit board (PCB). They are used for high speed, high precision placing of a broad range of electronic components (such as capacitors, resistors, and integrated circuits) onto the PCBs which are in turn used in computers, consumer electronics, and industrial, medical, automotive, military and telecommunications equipment. Similar equipment exists for through-hole components. This type of equipment is sometimes used to package microchips using the flip chip method.

== History ==
=== Early development (1960s–1970s) ===
The origins of pick-and-place automation can be traced back to the 1960s, with the introduction of the first industrial robots designed to perform repetitive tasks with high precision. The Unimate, developed in 1961 by George Devol and Joseph Engelberger, was the first programmable pick-and-place robot used in manufacturing environments. Early applications included material handling, assembly, and packaging, laying the groundwork for later advances in surface-mount technology (SMT) and electronics manufacturing. Subsequent innovations, such as the Stanford arm (1969) and the PUMA (robot) (1978), further expanded the capabilities of pick-and-place systems, enabling greater flexibility and accuracy in automated production environments.

=== 1980s and 1990s ===
During this time, a typical SMT assembly line employed two different types of pick-and-place (P&P) machines arranged in sequence.

The unpopulated board was fed into a rapid placement machine. These machines, sometimes called chip shooters, place mainly low-precision, simple package components such as resistors and capacitors. These high-speed P&P machines were built around a single turret design capable of mounting up to two dozen stations. As the turret spins, the stations passing the back of the machine pick up parts from tape feeders mounted on a moving carriage. As the station proceeds around the turret, it passes an optical station that calculates the angle at which the part was picked up, allowing the machine to compensate for drift. Then, as the station reaches the front of the turret, the board is moved into the proper position, the nozzle is spun to put the part in the proper angular orientation, and the part is placed on the board. Typical chip shooters can, under optimal conditions, place up to 53,000 parts per hour, or almost 15 parts per second.

Because the PCB is moved rather than the turret, only lightweight parts that will not be shaken loose by the violent motion of the PCB can be placed this way.

From the high speed machine, the board transits to a precision placement machine. These pick-and-place machines often use high resolution verification cameras and fine adjustment systems via high precision linear encoders on each axis to place parts more accurately than the high-speed machines. Furthermore, the precision placement machines are capable of handling larger or more irregularly shaped parts such as large package integrated circuits or packaged inductor coils and trimpots. Unlike the rapid placers, precision placers generally do not use turret mounted nozzles and instead rely on a gantry-supported moving head. These precision placers rely upon placement heads with relatively few pickup nozzles. The head sometimes has a laser identifier that scans a reflective marker on the PC board to orient the head to the board. Parts are picked up from tape feeders or trays, scanned by a camera (on some machines), and then placed in the proper position on the board. Some machines also center the parts on the head with two arms that close to center the part; the head then rotates 90 degrees and the arms close again to center the part once more. The margin of error for some components is less than half a millimeter (less than 0.02 inches).

=== 2000s ===
Due to the high cost of having two separate machines to place parts, the speed limitations of the chip shooters, and the inflexibility of the machines, electronic component machine manufacturers moved to all-in-one modular, multi-headed, and multi-gantry machines. These machines could have heads quickly swapped on different modules depending on the product being built, with multiple mini turrets capable of placing the whole spectrum of components with theoretical speeds of 136,000 components an hour. The fastest machines can have speeds of up to 200,000 CPH (components per hour).

=== 2010 onwards ===
Placement machines have developed all-in-one heads that can place components ranging from 0.4 mm × 0.2 mm to 50 mm × 40 mm. There is growing focus on software applications for the placement process. With new applications like POP and wafer placement on substrate, the industry has moved beyond conventional component placement.

For many SMT users, high speed machines are not suitable due to cost. Recent changes in the economic climate have shifted requirements toward machines with greater versatility for short runs and fast changeover. Lower cost machines with vision systems provide an affordable option for many users, and low-end and mid-range machines are more widely used than ultra-fast placement systems.

=== Developments until 2025 ===
Since 2010, pick-and-place machines have undergone significant advancements driven by the demands of electronics manufacturing services (EMS) and the proliferation of surface-mount devices (SMDs). Modern machines increasingly incorporate machine vision systems, artificial intelligence, and advanced software for real-time optimization of the placement process. There is a growing emphasis on flexible manufacturing and rapid changeover, allowing for efficient production of both high-mix, low-volume and high-volume assemblies. Furthermore, the integration of Internet of Things (IoT) connectivity and data analytics has enabled predictive maintenance and improved overall equipment effectiveness (OEE) in contemporary pick-and-place operations.

== Operation ==
The placement equipment is part of a larger overall machine that carries out specific programmed steps to create a PCB assembly. Several sub-systems work together to pick up and correctly place the components onto the PCB. These systems normally use pneumatic suction cups, attached to a plotter-like device to allow the cup to be accurately manipulated in three dimensions. Additionally, each nozzle can be rotated independently.

=== Component feeds ===
Surface mount components are placed along the front (and often back) faces of the machine. Most components are supplied on paper or plastic tape, in tape reels that are loaded onto feeders mounted to the machine. Larger integrated circuits (ICs) are sometimes supplied and arranged in trays which are stacked in a compartment. More commonly used ICs will be provided in tapes rather than trays or sticks. Improvements in feeder technology mean that tape format is becoming the preferred method of presenting parts on an SMT machine.

Early feeder heads were much bulkier, and as a result, it was not designed to be the mobile part of the system. Rather, the PCB itself was mounted on a moving platform that aligned the areas of the board to be populated with the feeder head above.

=== Conveyor belt ===
Through the middle of the machine there is a conveyor belt, along which blank PCBs travel, and a PCB clamp in the center of the machine. The PCB is clamped, and the nozzles pick up individual components from the feeders/trays, rotate them to the correct orientation and then place them on the appropriate pads on the PCB with high precision. High-end machines can have multiple conveyors to produce multiple same or different kinds of products simultaneously.

=== Inspection and visual system ===
The part being carried from the part feeders on either side of the conveyor belt to the PCB is photographed from below using a high resolution camera and a lighting system. Its silhouette is inspected to see if it is damaged or missing, and registration errors in pickup are measured and compensated for when the part is placed. For example, if the part was shifted 0.25 mm and rotated 10° when picked up, the pickup head will adjust the placement position to place the part in the correct location.

Some machines have optical systems on the robot arm and can carry out optical calculations without losing time, achieving a lower derating factor. High-end optical systems mounted on the heads can also capture details of non-standard components and save them to a database for future use. Advanced software is also available for monitoring production and interconnecting the production floor with supply chain data in real-time.

A separate camera on the pick-and-place head photographs fiducial marks on the PCB to measure its position on the conveyor belt accurately. Two fiducial marks, measured in two dimensions each, usually placed diagonally, let the PCB's orientation and thermal expansion be measured and compensated for. Some machines are also able to measure PCB shear by measuring a third fiducial mark.

=== Variations ===
To minimize the distance the pickup gantry must travel, it is common to have multiple nozzles with separate vertical motion on a single gantry. This can pick up multiple parts with one trip to the feeders. Advanced software in newer generation machines also allows different robotic heads to work independently of each other to further increase throughput.

The components may be temporarily adhered to the PCB using wet solder paste, or by using small blobs of a separate adhesive, applied by a glue-dispensing machine that can be incorporated into the pick and place machine. The glue is added before component placement, dispensed by nozzles or by jet dispensing.

== See also ==
- Component placement
- Insertion mount machine
