= Solder paste =

Material used in the manufacture of printed circuit boards

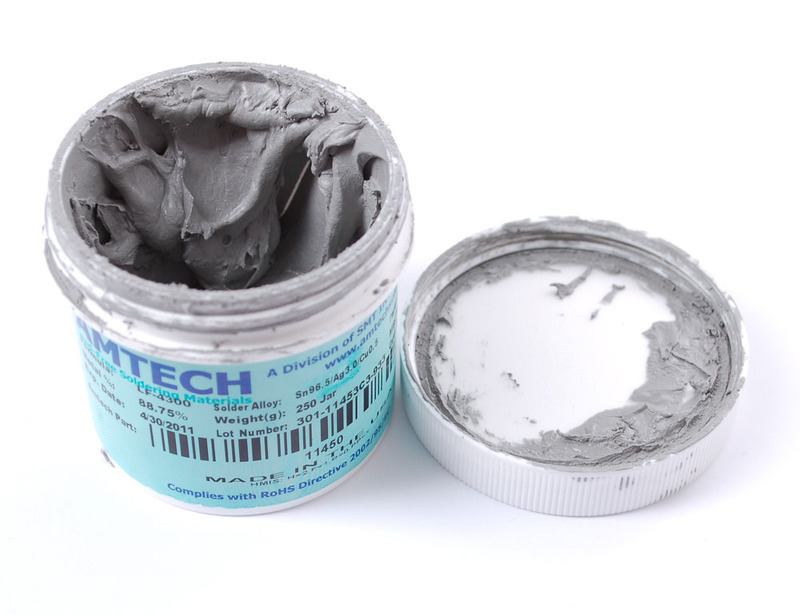
Solder paste in a storage container

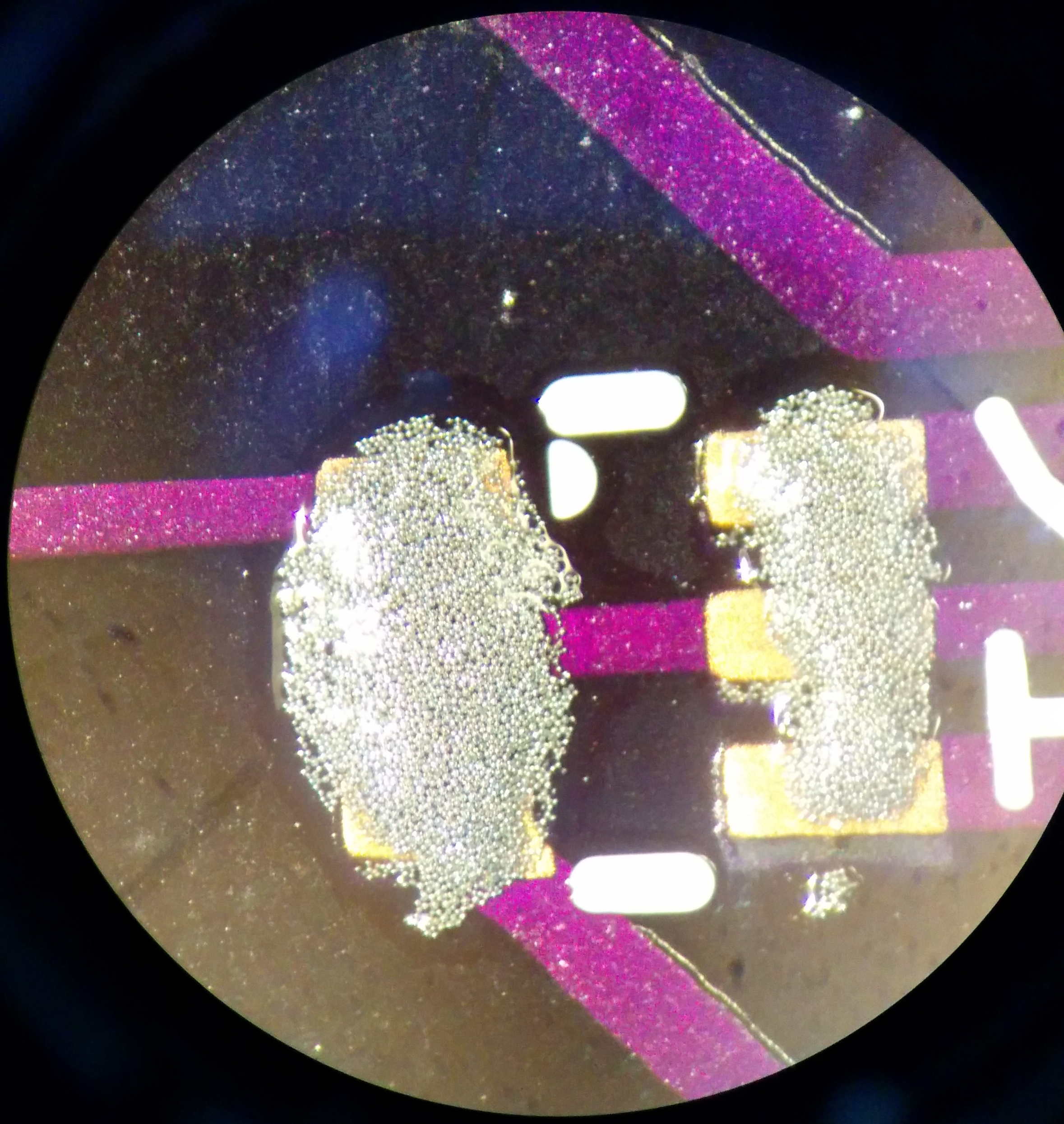
Solder paste viewed under a microscope.

Solder paste is a preparation of powdered solder in sticky flux paste primarily used to solder surface mount components onto printed circuit boards. It is also possible to solder through-hole pin in paste components by printing solder paste in and over the holes. The sticky paste temporarily holds components in place; the board is then heated, melting the paste and forming a mechanical bond as well as an electrical connection.

== Composition ==
A solder paste is essentially powdered solder suspended in flux paste. The tackiness of the flux holds components in place until the soldering reflow process melts the solder. As a result of environmental legislation, most solders today, including solder pastes, are made of lead-free alloys.

== Use ==
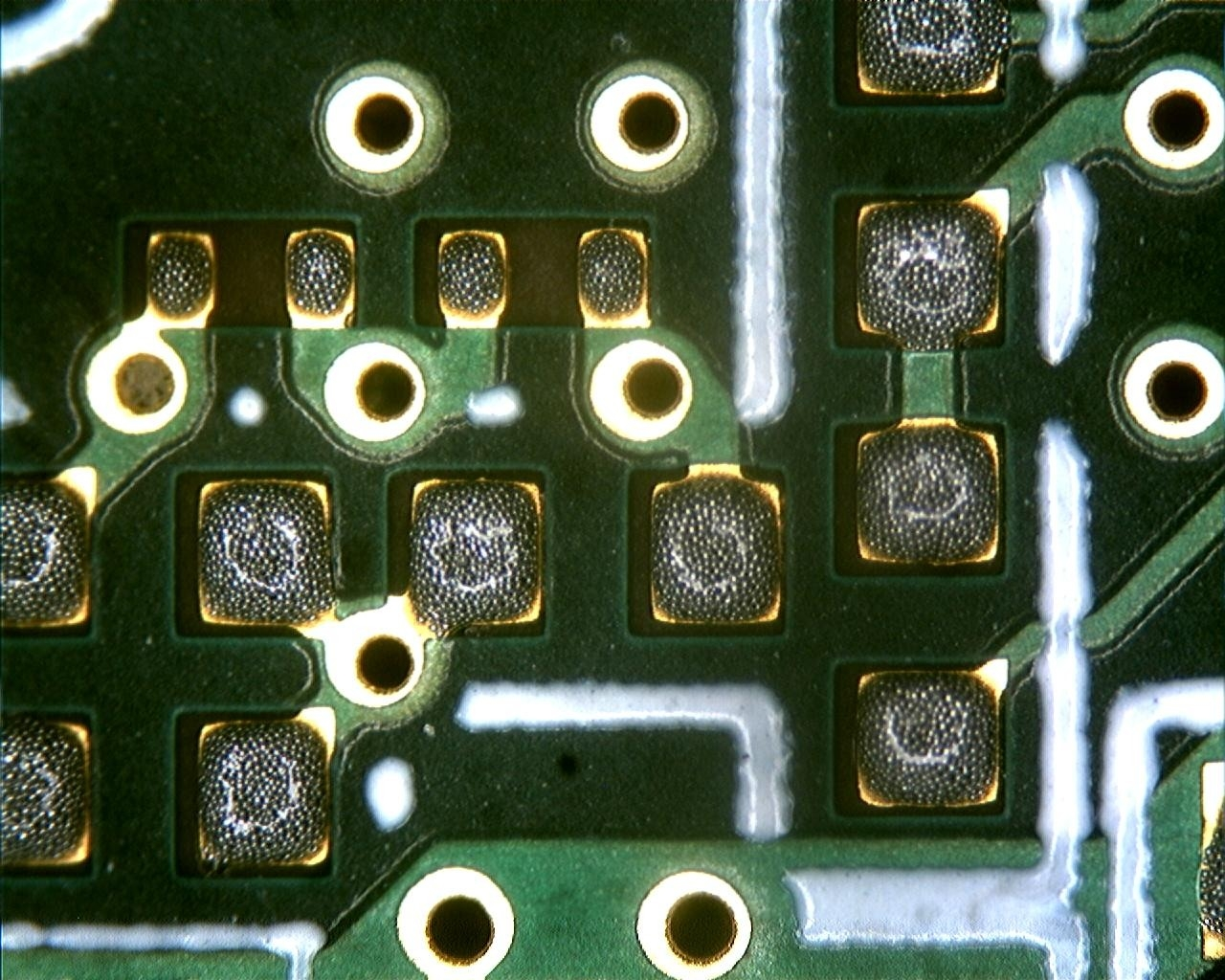
Solder paste printed on a PCB

Solder paste is typically used in a stencil printing process by a solder paste printer, in which paste is deposited over a stainless steel or polyester mask to create the desired pattern on a printed circuit board. The paste may be dispensed pneumatically, by pin transfer (where a grid of pins is dipped in solder paste and then applied to the board), or by jet printing (where the paste is ejected onto the pads through nozzles, like an inkjet printer).

After paste printing, the components are placed by a pick-and-place machine or by hand. As well as forming the solder joint itself, the paste carrier/flux must have sufficient tackiness to hold the components while the assembly passes through the various manufacturing processes, perhaps moved around the factory.

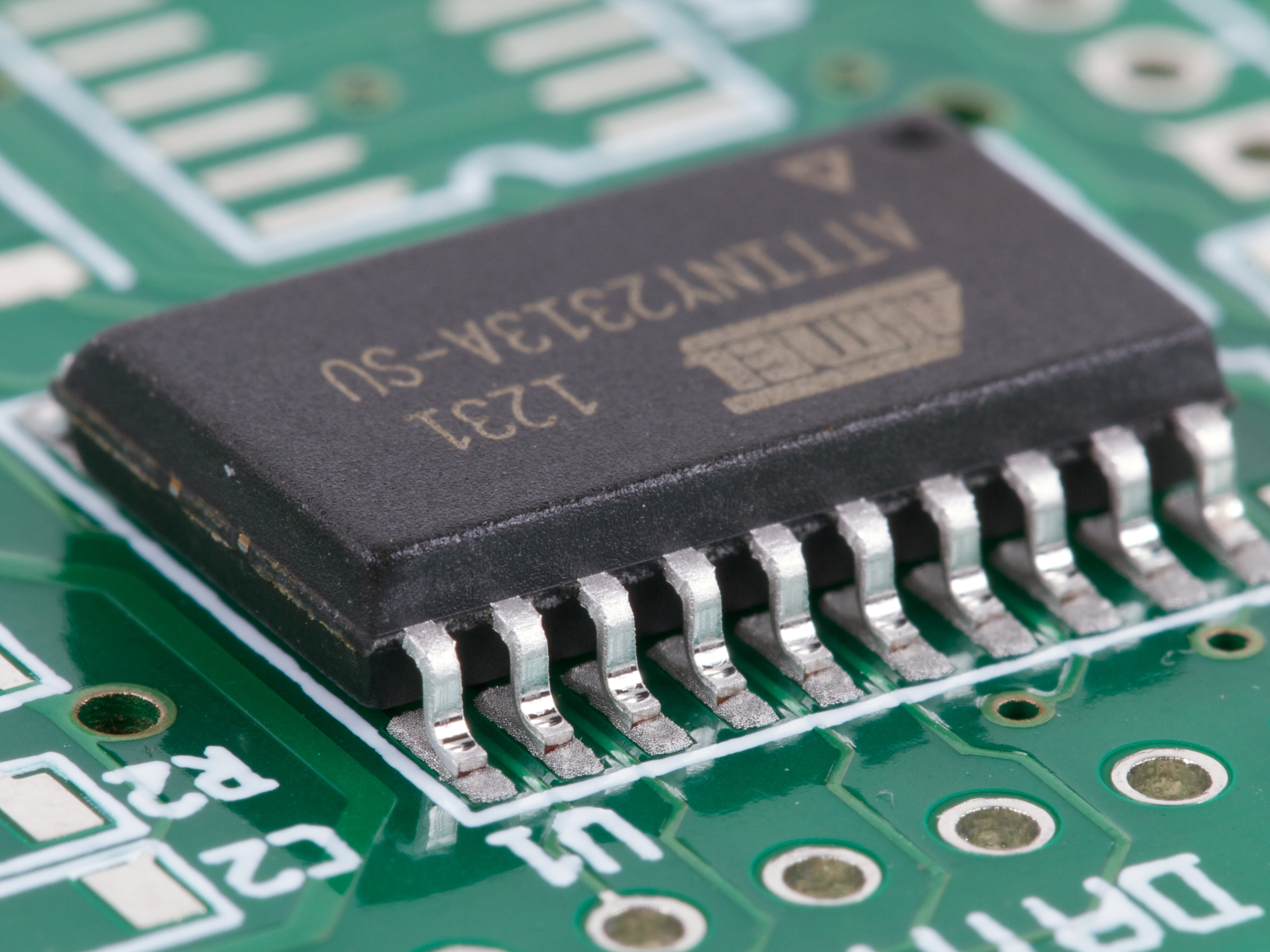
A Attiny microcontroller placed in solder paste before reflow soldering

Component placement is followed by a reflow soldering process.

The paste manufacturer will suggest a suitable reflow temperature profile to suit their individual paste. The main requirement is a gentle rise in temperature to prevent explosive expansion (which can cause "solder balling"), yet activate the flux. Thereafter, the solder melts. The time in this area is known as Time Above Liquidus. A reasonably rapid cool-down period is required after this time.

For a good soldered joint, the proper amount of solder paste must be used. Too much paste may result in a short circuit; too little may result in poor electrical connection or physical strength. Although solder paste typically contains around 90% metal in solids by weight, the volume of the soldered joint is only about half that of the solder paste applied. This is due to the presence of flux and other non-metallic agents in the paste, and the lower density of the metal particles when suspended in the paste as compared to the final, solid alloy.

As with all fluxes used in electronics, residues left behind may be harmful to the circuit, and standards (e.g., J-std, JIS, IPC) exist to measure the safety of the residues left behind.

In most countries, "no-clean" solder pastes are the most common; in the United States, water-soluble pastes (which have compulsory cleaning requirements) are common.

== Classification ==
=== By size ===
The size and shape of the metal particles in the solder paste determines how well the paste will "print". A solder ball is spherical in shape; this helps in reducing surface oxidation and ensures good joint formation with the adjoining particles. Irregular particle sizes are not used, as they tend to clog the stencil, causing printing defects. To produce a quality solder joint, it's very important for the spheres of metal to be very regular in size and have a low level of oxidation.

Solder pastes are classified based on the particle size by IPC standard J-STD 005. The table below shows the classification type of a paste compared with the mesh size and particle size. Some suppliers use proprietary particle size descriptions, Henkel/Loctite descriptions are given for comparison.

Type designation [IPC]	Mesh size in lines-per-inch	Max. size in μm (no larger than)	Max. size in μm (less than 1% larger than)	Particle size in μm (80% min. between)	Avg. size in μm	Min. size in μm (10% max. less than)	Henkel powder description
Type 1			150	150-75		20	
Type 2	−200/+325		75	75–45	60	20	
Type 3	−325/+500		45	45–25	36	20	AGS
Type 4	−400/+635		38	38–20	31	20	DAP
Type 5	−500/+635	30	25	25–10		10	KBP
Type 6	−635	20	15	15–5		5	
Type 7		15	11	11–2			
Type 8		11	10	8–2			

=== By flux ===
According to IPC standard J-STD-004 "Requirements for Soldering Fluxes", solder pastes are classified into three types based on the flux types:

Rosin based fluxes are made with rosin, a natural extract from pine trees. These fluxes can be cleaned if required after the soldering process using a solvent (potentially including chlorofluorocarbons) or saponifying flux remover.

Water-soluble fluxes are made up of organic materials and glycol bases. There is a wide variety of cleaning agents for these fluxes.

A no-clean flux is designed to leave only small amounts of inert flux residues. No-clean pastes save not only cleaning costs, but also capital expenditures and floor space. However, these pastes need a very clean assembly environment and may need an inert reflow environment.

Halogen-free no-clean solder pastes, classified as ROL0 under J-STD-004B, exhibit trace chloride levels below 0.05% in reflowed residues with no added halides, supporting reliable lead-free surface mount assembly in air or nitrogen reflow.

== Properties of solder paste ==
In using solder paste for circuit assemblies, one needs to test and understand the various rheological properties of a solder paste.

Viscosity
The degree to which the material resists the tendency to flow. The viscosity for a particular paste is available from the manufacturer's catalog; in-house testing is sometimes needed to judge the remaining usability of solder paste after a period of use.

Thixotropic index
Solder paste is thixotropic, meaning that its viscosity changes with applied shear force (such as stirring or spreading). The thixotropic index is a measure of the viscosity of the solder paste at rest, compared to the viscosity of "worked" paste. Depending upon the formulation of the paste, it may be very important to stir the paste before use, to ensure that the viscosity is appropriate for proper application. When solder paste is moved by the squeegee on the stencil, the physical stress applied to the paste causes the viscosity to drop, allowing the paste to flow easily through the apertures on the stencil. When the stress on the paste is removed, it regains its viscosity, preventing it from flowing on the circuit board.

Slump
The characteristic of a material's tendency to spread after application. Theoretically, the paste's sidewalls are perfectly straight after the paste is deposited on the circuit board, and it will remain like that until the part placement. If the paste has a high slump value, it might deviate from the expected behavior, as now the paste's sidewalls are not perfectly straight. A paste's slump should be minimized, as slump creates the risk of forming solder bridges between two adjacent lands, creating a short circuit.

Working life
The amount of time solder paste can stay on a stencil without affecting its printing properties. The paste manufacturer provides this value.

Tack
Tack is the property of a solder paste to hold a component after the component had been placed by the placement machine. Hence, tack life is the critical property of solder pastes. It is defined as the length of time that solder paste can remain exposed to the atmosphere without a significant change in tack properties. A solder paste with long tack life is more likely to provide the user with a consistent and robust printing process.

Response-to-pause
Response-to-pause (RTP) is measured by the difference in volume of solder paste deposition as a function of number of prints and pause time. A large variation in the print volume after a pause is unacceptable as this causes end of line defects such as shorts or opens. A good solder paste shows less variation in the volume of the prints after pause. However, another may show large variations and also an overall decreasing trend in volume.

== Storage ==
Solder paste must be refrigerated when transported and stored in an airtight container at a temperature between 0 and 10 °C. It should be warmed to room temperature for use.

Recently, new solder pastes have been introduced that remain stable at 26.5 °C for one year and at 40 °C for one month.

Exposure of the solder particles, in their raw powder form, to air causes them to oxidize, so exposure should be minimized.

== Evaluation ==
The main reason why evaluation of solder paste is necessary, is because 50–90% of all defects result from printing problems. Hence, paste evaluation is critical.

This procedure is quite thorough, yet minimizes the amount of testing required to differentiate between excellent and poor solder pastes. If multiple solder pastes are evaluated, the procedure can be used to eliminate the poor pastes from their poor printing quality. Further testing, such as solder reflow performance, solder joint quality, and reliability testing can then be performed on the solder paste finalists.

== Common errors & defects ==
A majority of the defects in circuit-board assembly are caused due to issues in the solder-paste printing process or due to defects in the solder paste. There are many different types of defects possible, e.g. too much solder, or the solder melts and connects too many wires (bridging), resulting in a short circuit. Insufficient amounts of paste result in incomplete circuits. Head-in-pillow defects, or incomplete coalescence of ball grid array (BGA) sphere and solder paste deposit, is a failure mode that has seen increased frequency since the transition to lead-free soldering. Often missed during inspection, a head-in-pillow (HIP) defect appears like a head resting on a pillow with a visible separation in the solder joint at the interface of the BGA sphere and reflowed paste deposit. An electronics manufacturer needs experience with the printing process, specifically the paste characteristics, to avoid costly re-work on the assemblies. The paste's physical characteristics, like viscosity and flux levels, need to be monitored periodically by performing in-house tests.

When making PCBs (printed circuit boards), manufacturers often test the solder paste deposits using SPI (solder paste inspection). SPI systems measure the volume of the solder pads before the components are applied and the solder melted. SPI systems can reduce the incidence of solder-related defects to statistically insignificant amounts as they often use 3D imaging (e.g., laser triangulation or structured light projection) to capture a full volumetric profile of the solder paste on each pad. The machine compares the measurements to predefined tolerances and flags any deviations. Inline systems are manufactured by various companies such as Delvitech (Switzerland), Sinic-Tek (China), Koh Young (Korea), GOEPEL electronic (Germany), CyberOptics (US), Parmi (Korea) and Test Research, Inc. (Taiwan). Offline systems are manufactured by various companies such as by VisionMaster, Inc. (US) and Sinic-Tek (China).

== Concerns ==
The main concerns about solder paste are:

1. It can dry out on the stencil if kept out for too long.
2. It may be toxic.
3. It is expensive and waste has to be minimized.

== See also ==
- Flux
- Helping hand (tool)
- Solder
- Soldering
- Wave soldering
- Reflow soldering
- Restriction of Hazardous Substances Directive (RoHS)
- Non-Newtonian fluid
