= 2005 Industrial Design Excellence Awards =

The Industrial Design Excellence Awards is a program sponsored by BusinessWeek and the Industrial Designers Society of America ("IDSA"). These are the awards which were given out for 2005.

Return to Industrial Design Excellence Awards.

== Business & Industrial Products ==
=== Gold Winners ===
1. Terabeam 3200i Optical Transceiver (indoor)
2. Nike ACG Search and Rescue CommVEST
3. TOPTURN X Self-propelled Compost Turner
4. Johnson Controls 9100 Series Environmental Room Control Sensors

=== Silver Winners ===
1. Samsung Techwin UF-80 Digital Presenter
2. Uvex FitLogic Safety Eyewear

== Computer Equipment ==
=== Gold Winners ===
1. Mac Mini
2. NetGear Platinum II
3. Intous3

=== Silver Winners ===
1. PalmOne Zire 72
2. JBL OnStage iPod docking station
3. Alienware ALX Desktop Computer
4. Samsung M40
5. NYSE Wireless Handheld Computer
6. ASUS VENTO 3600 DESKTOP PC
7. Airport Express
8. Decru DataFort network security appliance
9. Panasonic TOUGHBOOK CF-R3 laptop
10. bUnit personal authentication device
11. Avid Mojo video editing tool
12. Asus SDRW 0804P-D External DVD Burner

=== Bronze Winners ===
1. BenQ LCD Monitor Crazy Arm
2. Levono Smartphone ET960
3. Siemens SINAMICS S120 Power inverter
4. HP3770 Scanner

== Consumer Products ==
=== Gold Winners ===
1. Stanley FatMax Hacksaw
2. Motorola Razr V3 Mobile Phone
3. Gerber SippySnacker
4. Nike Considered Boot
5. Sony QUALIA016 Digital Camera
6. iPod Shuffle
7. Spring Roll - Fetch toy for dogs
8. CafeSolo coffee-maker
9. Barrel Grill
10. BYO lunchbag

=== Silver Winners ===
1. Hullavator Vehicle Roof Rack System
2. HP Photosmart 375 Portable Printer
3. ZARA 3 Stage Baby Transporter
4. Signature Series Strength Machines
5. JBL OnTour portable sound system
6. Siemens ultraSense laundry system
7. IRIVER IFP1000 Series MP3 Player & Digital Camera
8. Timberland Travel Gear
9. 3D Mechanical Puzzle
10. BRP / BV2S Helmet
11. Ambilight FTV Step Wrap Flat TV
12. Nokia 2650
13. Self-watering flowerpot
14. Hammerhead Sled
15. GlowBuoy Floating Pool Light
16. PUR Advanced Filtering Water Cooler by Kaz
17. Full Contact Spice Grinder
18. RKS Pop Series Guitars

=== Bronze Winners ===
1. Wilson nCode with new Triad technology tennis rackets
2. K2 T1 Boot with Boa Liner
3. Tupperware Flat Out
4. Leapfrog LeapPad Family
5. Hitachi DS18DMR 18 Volt Driver Drill
6. Virgin BoomTube Portable Speakers
7. Rubbermaid Paint Buddy
8. MINI_motion Watch
9. Samsung Miniket SC-M110 multifunctional pocket director
10. Whirlpool Fabric Freshener
11. Philips HS740 Lasso Fashion Headphones
12. Disposable, eco-friendly footwear, 'SOLEMATES'
13. PerfectDraft
14. iRobot Roomba Discovery Floorvac
15. Stanley S2 Laser Level Square
16. systemized tableware
17. Initech GEOLOGIC
18. Safety 1st Perfect Fit Gate
19. Gerber Truss Clip Knife
20. the iXi Bike

== Design Explorations ==
=== Gold Winners ===
1. SHIFT Concept Bike
2. Toshiba Red Transformer laptop
3. Mitsubishi E Boost Concept Car
4. IBM Audio Video Speech Recognition System
5. Civic Exchange
6. The food experience

=== Silver Winners ===
1. MicroMedia Paper
2. Jeep Hurricane
3. Breathe CT concept
4. HP Masher concept
5. Nike eyeD - Device Singularity 2014
6. Lexus LF-A Concept Car

=== Bronze Winners ===
1. Origami DVD Player
2. SLIMFP
3. Mobile Concept PC for On-The-Go
4. Snap Bracelet Concept
5. DJammer concept
6. Microsoft Windows Home Center

== Design Strategy ==
=== Gold Winners ===
1. MINI motion Strategy

=== Silver Winners ===
1. Open Architecture Electric Guitar

== Digital Media & Interfaces ==
=== Gold Winners ===
1. Eastman Innovation Lab

=== Silver Winners ===
1. Nike ID

=== Bronze Winners ===
1. Vectra Multimedia Interface

== Environments ==
=== Gold Winners ===
1. Ambient Experience for Healthcare
2. Rubbermaid 9s09 Folding Safety Cone (a.k.a. Mr. Twister)
3. Clinton Presidential Center

=== Silver Winners ===
1. ImageNet - Carrollton, Texas
2. Team America: World Police
3. Energy for the Future - DaimlerChrysler Corporate at Mondial de l'Automobile 2004, Paris
4. California College of the Arts Graduate Center
5. JetBlue Self-service Check-in Kiosk

=== Bronze Winners ===
1. Friend Store Interior
2. Kansas City Downtown Library Book Bindings
3. Head First!
4. Space for Outstanding Personalities
5. Cherry Blossom

== Furniture ==
=== Gold Winners ===
1. Kohler Purist Hatbox Toilet

=== Silver Winners ===
1. Large and Small Swarovski Nest Chandelier
2. Leviton Acenti
3. LED-LENSER Lily Marleen

== Medical and Scientific Equipment ==
=== Gold Winners ===
1. LifeSync Corporation (formerly GMP Wireless Medicine) Wireless ECG Monitor
2. VIOlight Toothbrush Sanitizer (Philippe Starck)
3. Cardiovations Ethicon, Inc., a Johnson & Johnson Company, Embrace Heart Stabilizer
4. Niton family of XRF Analyzers & Accessories

=== Silver Winners ===
1. Denco Personal Grooming Tools
2. Vicks Digital thermometer family - Baby Rectal
3. Canon CXDI-50G Digital radiography device
4. Allura Xper FD10 + FD20 Flat Detector Systems
5. Medtronic M4 Microdebrider
6. ZENON Environmental ZeeWeed 1000 v3 Municipal Water filtration system

=== Bronze Winners ===
1. Scholl Arch Supports
2. Dionex ICS-3000 Ion chromatography machine
3. ProPlus 2450 Scale, Health o meter Professional
4. NIOX MINO Monitor
5. Lumiphase LED System
6. Steth Reflex Hammer

== Packaging & Graphics ==
=== Gold Winners ===
1. 1-2 Paint

=== Silver Winners ===
1. Method 3X Laundry Detergent

=== Bronze Winners ===
1. Clorox/Armor All Wipes Dispensing Closure
2. Echo by Davidoff
3. Tresdon - WineCase/WineRack System

== Design Research ==
=== Gold Winners ===
1. Moen Revolution Showerhead

=== Silver Winners ===
1. Chicago PT KineAssist Research

== Student Designs ==
=== Gold Winners ===
1. 'Spotlight the music and touch the light' - Audio system interfacing with Lighting
2. MOTUS: Integrated Automotive Interior for Active Paraplegics
3. I/O Brush

=== Silver Winners ===
1. In Search of Identity

=== Bronze Winners ===
1. Dyaun IV Pole
2. Hard shell backpack with locking system
3. ACORN manual coffee grinder
4. Family Class aircraft travel category
5. empower concept shoes
6. Sink Sponge

== Transportation ==
=== Silver Winners ===
1. Goodyear Assurance Featuring TripleTred Technology
2. BMW Mini Convertible

== Sources ==
- IDEA 2005 Gallery
