= Squeegee =

Cleaning tool

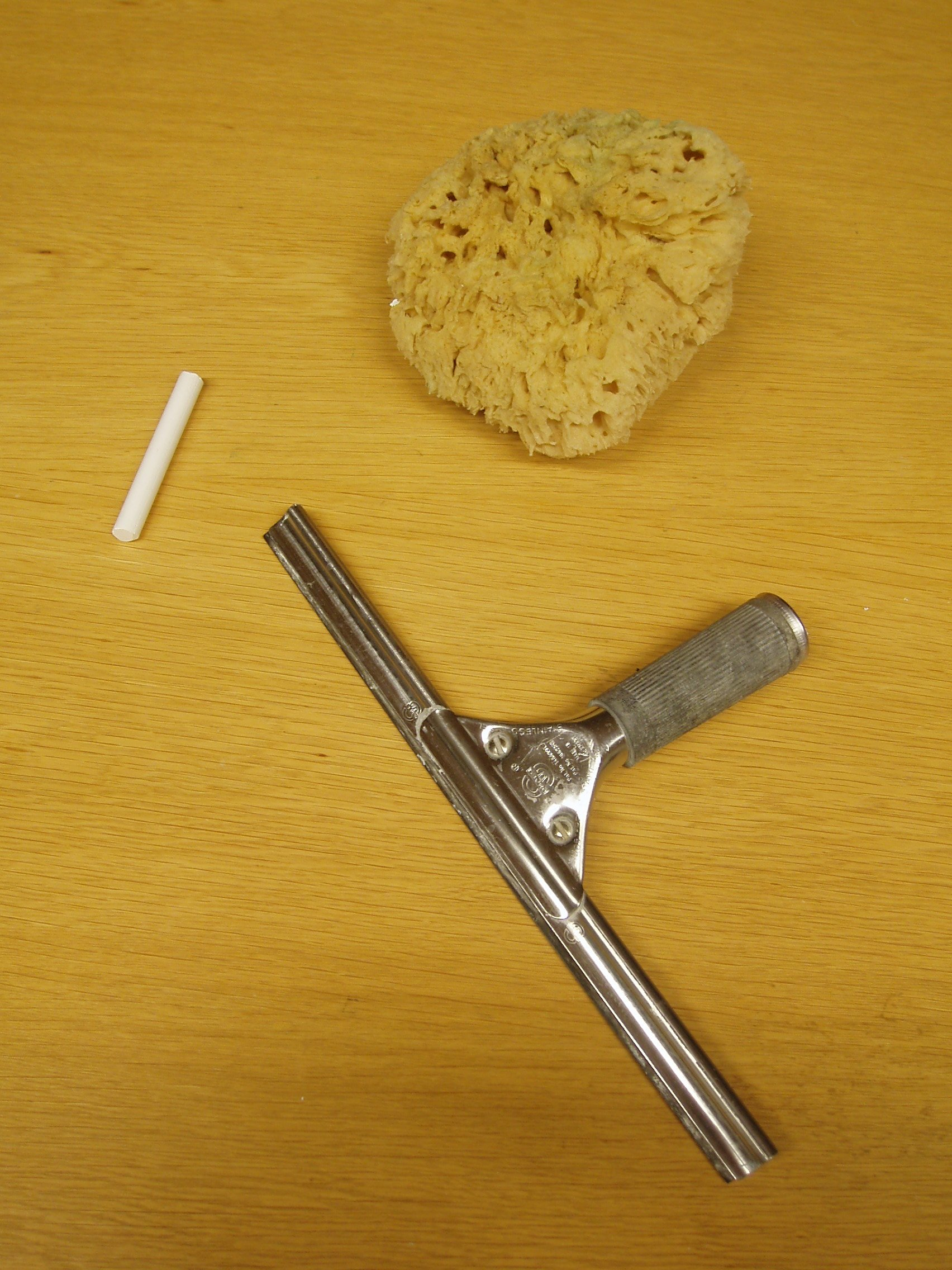
Squeegee, sponge, and chalk on a desk

A squeegee or squilgee is a tool with a flat, smooth rubber blade, used to remove or control the flow of liquid on a flat surface. It is used for cleaning and in printing.

== Etymology ==
The earliest written references to squeegees date from the mid-18th century and concern deck-cleaning tools, some with leather rather than rubber blades. The name "squeegee" may come from the word "squeege", meaning press or squeeze, which was first recorded in 1783. The closely related "squeedging" was reportedly first used in 1782, in the Covent Garden Theatre, during the performing of the comedy Which is the Man? by Hannah Cowley.

The earliest quotations mentioning squeegees in the Oxford English Dictionary refer to their use in cleaning decks on board ship: in 1844 a "squee gee" in an American book, in 1851 a "leathern squilgee" in Moby-Dick, and in 1867 in a British book by Admiral William Henry Smyth. Additionally, Richard Henry Dana's 1840 memoir Two Years Before the Mast mentions “squilgeeing” in Chapter XIV.

The following are considered correct English terminologies, according to the Canadian Naval Terminology Standardization Committee:

- squeegee
- deck squeegee
- squilgee
- squillagee

== Window cleaning ==
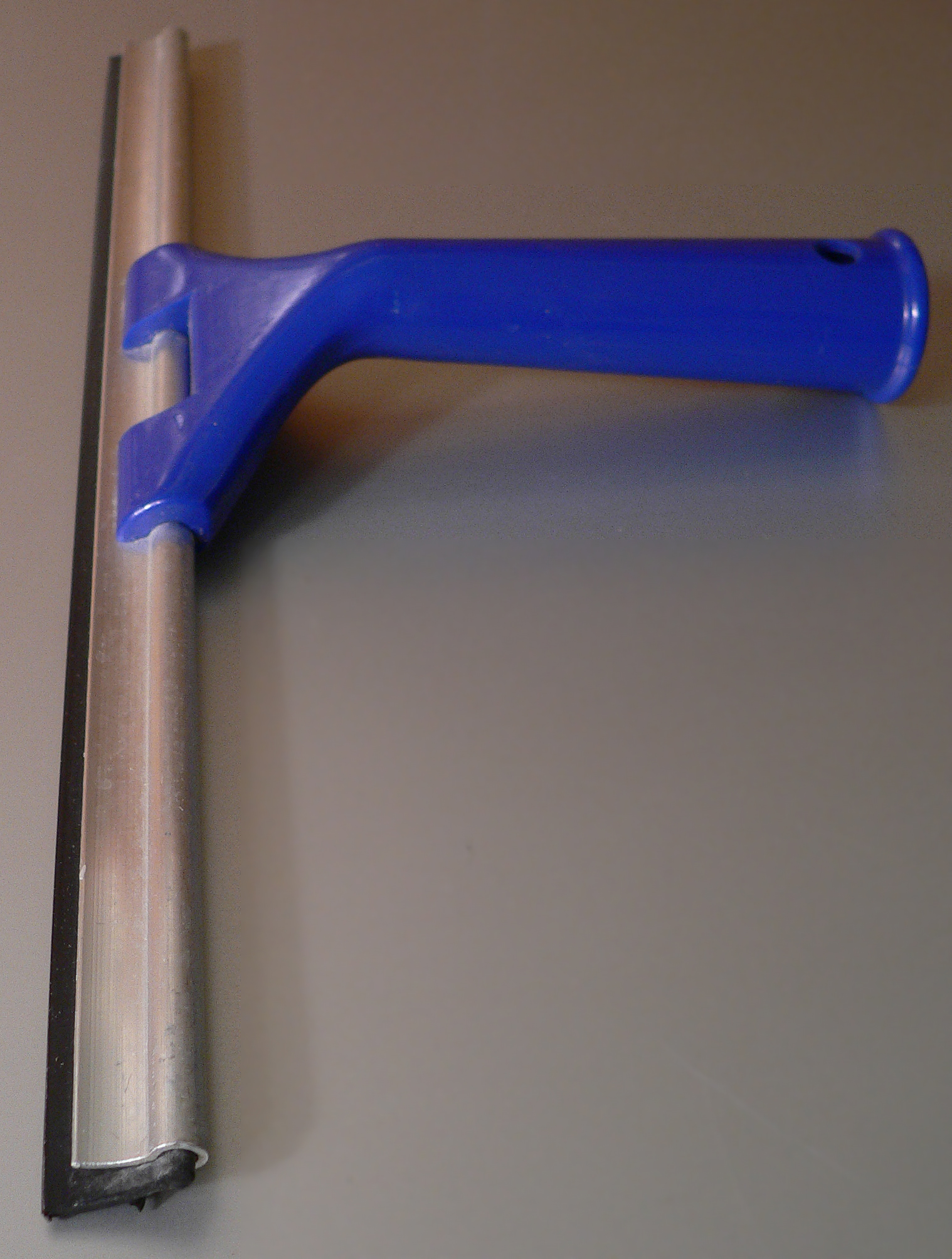
A window squeegee

The best-known of these tools is probably the hand-held window squeegee, used to remove the cleaning fluid or water from a glass surface. A soapy solution acts as a lubricant and breaks up the dirt, then the squeegee is used to draw the now water-borne dirt off the glass leaving a clean surface. Some squeegees are backed with a sponge which can soak up soapy water from a bucket for application to a dirty window.

Squeegees were in use for cleaning windows by 1918 when an American book on navy jargon explained that a deck-cleaning tool called a squeegee was "used in civil life to clean windows". This is the earliest written reference to a window cleaning squeegee given by the Oxford English Dictionary. (For earlier uses see "floor cleaning" section below.)

With the development of the skyscraper in the 20th century, a more efficient tool for the cleaning of window exteriors was needed. Professional window washers began using the Chicago squeegee, a bulky tool with two heavy pink rubber blades. Changing the blades required the loosening of twelve separate screws. The modern single-blade window cleaning squeegee was patented by Ettore Steccone in 1936, who dubbed it the "New Deal". It was made of lightweight brass with a very flexible and sharp rubber blade. Steccone began a manufacturing process and sold the product in his garage. The Ettore Products Co. is still the leader in the squeegee market today. Squeegee kits can include a telescoping pole to extend the washer's reach.

Simple squeegees are made in various shapes for household use, including the cleaning of shower doors, bathroom tile, and garage floors.

There is a double-sided squeegee model. On one side is the classic squeegee, on the other side is a soft sponge for applying the detergent. The squeegee is usually sold with a short handle.

Companies produce squeegees for home use, as well as professional squeegees for use by cleaning companies and private glass cleaners who provide services to the public.

Professional squeegees are made from:

- plastic;
- stainless steel;
- sometimes a rubber non-slip coating is applied to the handle.

Tools can be equipped with swivel mechanisms - which is convenient if you need to reach the farthest part of the window or the surface has a rounded configuration.

=== Techniques ===
The "swivel method", or "fan method" as it is referred to by professionals, uses a series of strokes combined with turns that hold the water away from the leading edge of the squeegee; when the turn is completed in the opposing direction, there is no water and no dirt left isolated. Straight strokes, either horizontally or vertically, are normally much more efficient than “fanning” when using fixed handle squeegees; however, this method leads to more streaks and missed spots. If a few spots are missed, a chamois leather cloth works better for touch up than a towel of cloth or paper.

In 1992, Willie Erken invented the pivoting handle squeegee.

Using a squeegee for window cleaning may sometimes produce run lines. These are caused by cleaning fluid being pushed up into the top edge of the window, or by fluid flowing from under the rubber blade into the dry area of the glass. The latter of these cases may be prevented by holding the squeegee at a slight angle relative to the direction in which it is being moved, directing fluid flow towards the wet area of the glass.

Worn-out squeegee rubbers and damaged equipment will negatively affect cleaning results.

Another method used by window cleaners is to tap the blade on an already wet area of the glass to remove any excess water on the rubber blade. Alternatively the rubber blade can be dried with a towel, although this method is slower and not practical when using extension poles.

According to Guinness World Records, the world's fastest window cleaner is Terry Burrows of South Ockendon, Essex, England, who cleaned three standard 114.3-by-114.3-centimetre (45 in × 45 in) office windows set in a frame in 9.24 seconds at the National Exhibition Centre in Birmingham in March 2005. He used a 300-millimetre (11.75 in) squeegee and 9 litres (2 imperial gallons; 2.37 US gallons) of water.

== Floor cleaning ==
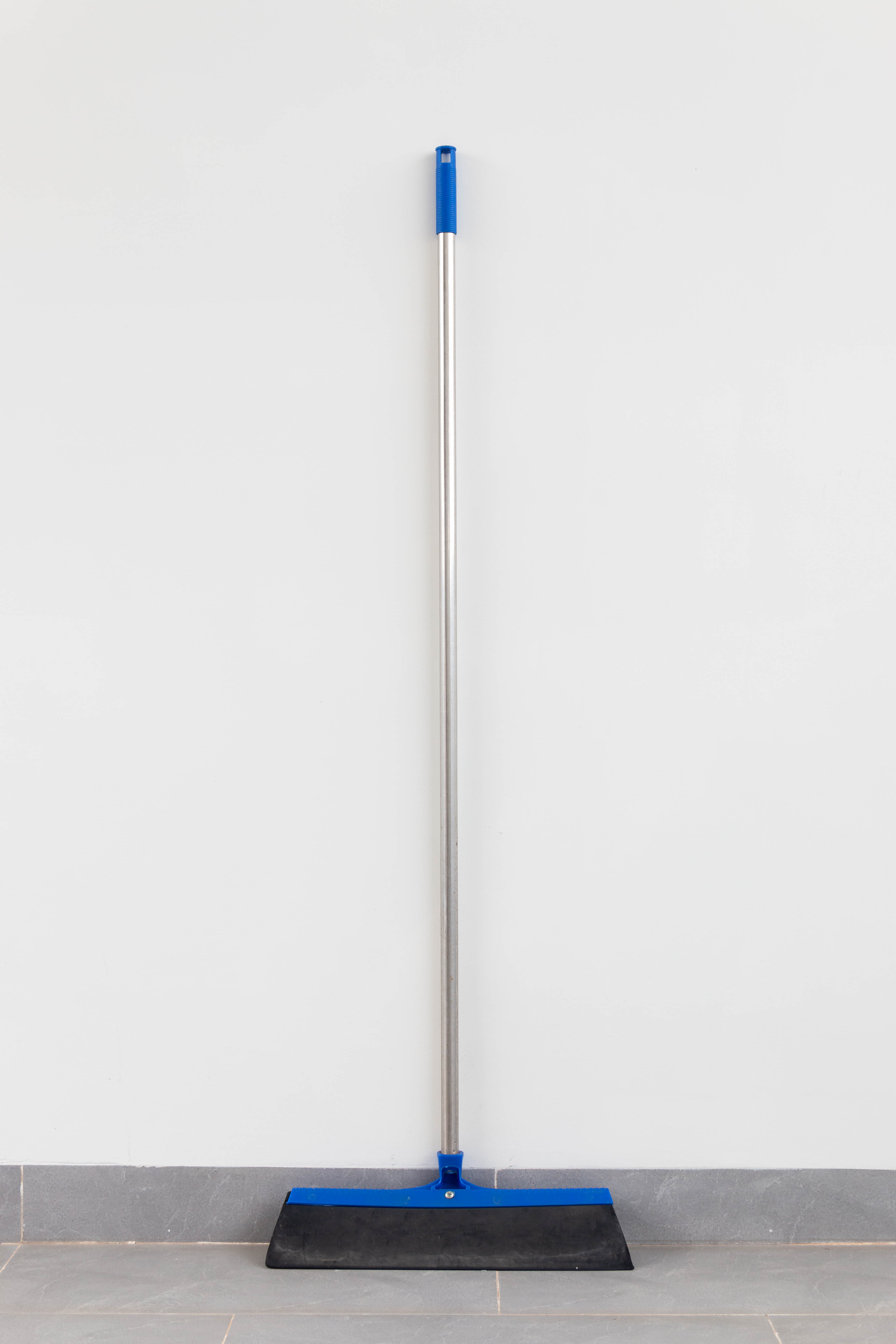
A floor squeegee

The floor squeegee is similar to the window squeegee but has a long handle like a push broom, used to clean floors after they have been sprayed with water or soap, to push the water into drains.

This is often used in places that need the floors cleaned regularly, such as army barracks or the meat departments in supermarkets. Hospitals sometimes use the floor squeegee to clean up any spills that occur in operating rooms or regular patient rooms, as the design of the squeegee lends itself towards a more sanitary cleanup.

Floor squeegees are often used on ship decks to clear excess water, as well as for cleaning.

== Street cleaning ==
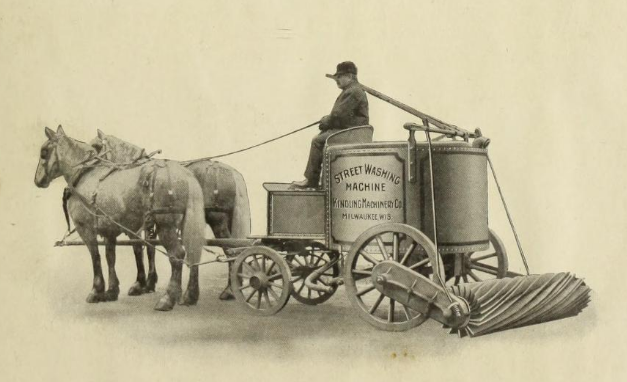
Kindling Street Washing Machine, also known as the Kindling Squeegee, c. 1911

Squeegees on broom handles were used for street cleaning in the later nineteenth century. This was the case in London by 1873. In the early twentieth century some cities in Europe and North America used horse-drawn machinery with rotating rubber squeegee blades on rollers behind a water tank connected to sprinklers. In 1911, this was described as "a German invention which has been for some years in successful operation in leading German cities". A US version of the rotating squeegee machine, known as the Kindling Squeegee or Kindling Street Washing Machine, was in use by the time of that description. It was manufactured in Milwaukee by Louis Kindling who had migrated from Germany to Wisconsin in 1873.

By 1915, some streets in Paris, Washington DC, and Philadelphia were being cleaned by this kind of machine, while London still depended on men with hand brooms and squeegees. In 1919, Kindling got a US patent for a design with "new and useful Improvements in Squeegee-Rollers", following another "improvements" patent for squeegee street cleaning machines filed in 1915 by the inventor and civil engineer Samuel Whinery (1845–1925) (resident of East Orange, New Jersey) and published in 1916.

In 1914, William H. Connell (Chief, Bureau of Highways and Street Cleaning in Philadelphia) explained that the street cleaning was done in batteries of "two and three squeegee machines preceded by sprinklers" reportedly about 200 yards (180 m) ahead. The American Highway Engineers' Handbook of 1919 reveals that this method was used in order for the water:

[...] to loosen up the dirt on the pavement without giving it time to evaporate. [...] The idea of sprinkling is to soften the surface and enable the squeegee to cleanse the streets of all slime as well as the coarser materials. The squeegees are followed by two men, whom immediately sweep up the windrows of dirt into piles, and a sufficient number of carts follow to remove the dirt from the streets.

The need for supporting labour and foot was seen as a disadvantage. Furthermore, the squeegee machines were pulled by horses, which would defecate on the streets which were intended to be cleansed. Therefore, they were gradually replaced by mechanical street cleaning devices, which were introduced as early as 1911.

== Printing and photography ==
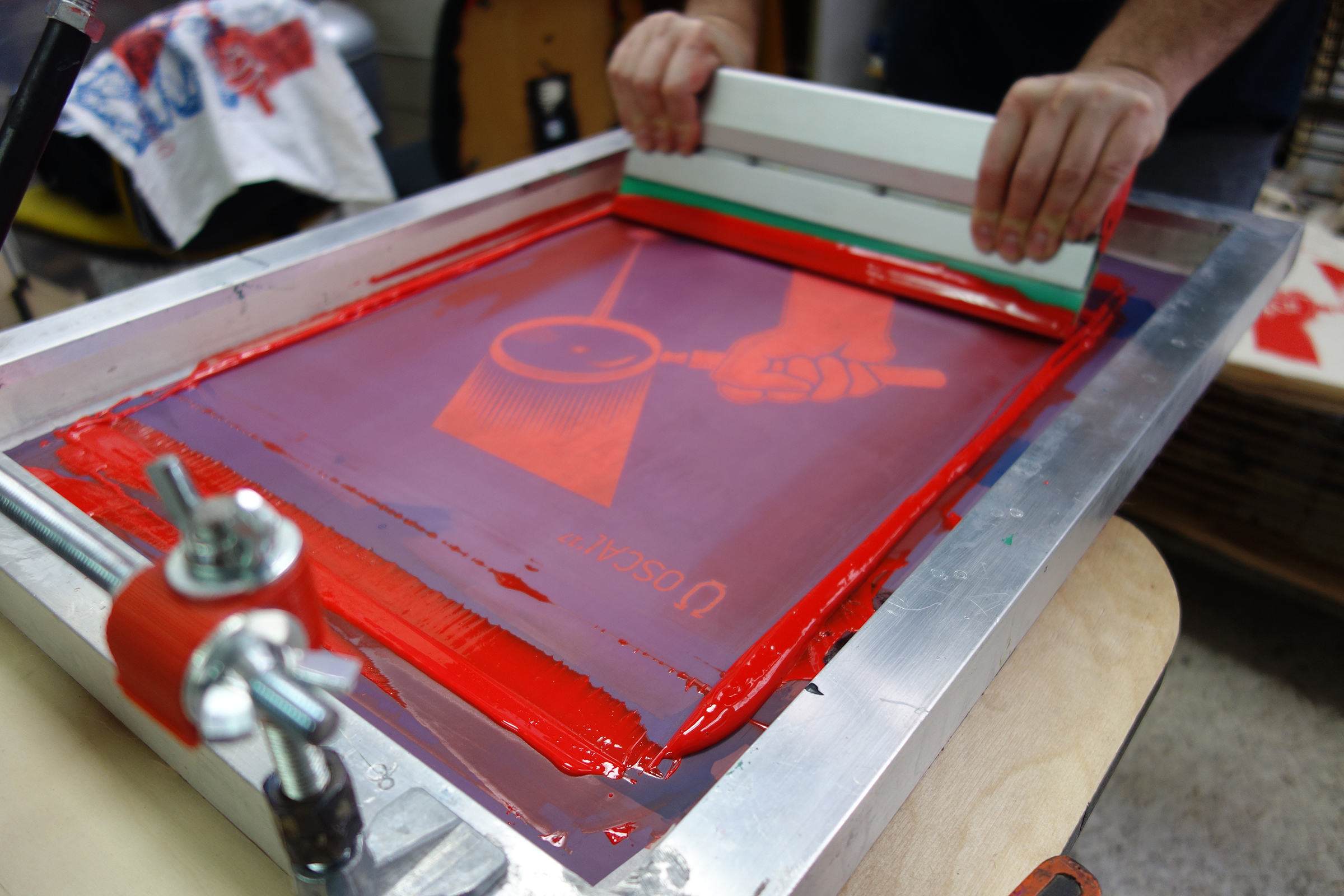
A squeegee used for screen printing

In screen printing, a squeegee is used to spread ink evenly across the back of a stencil or silkscreen, making a clean image on the printed surface. Screen-printing squeegees usually have much thicker and less flexible blades than the window cleaning variety.

A squeegee is also used in photography printing to dry the photographic paper after it is washed, preventing wrinkles or water spots. Photographic squeegees usually have thicker and more rigid blades than standard squeegees, to allow the photographer to apply more pressure and squeeze water out of the paper's fibers. A pair of squeegees mounted like tongs may also be used on photographic film to accelerate drying.

The earliest reference to a squeegee used for drying in photography is an 1878 description by chemist and photographer William Abney of squeezing excess water away. His squeegee had no handle, and was "a flat bar of wood, into which is let a piece of india-rubber about 1/2 centimetre thick and 2 centimetres broad". The user should note that "the india-rubber of the squeegee must be brought to bear with considerable pressure on to the surface of the paper, and the strokes made with it should commence from the centre and finish towards the ends".

== Sports ==
The ice on skating rinks is resurfaced using a squeegee and other tools. Nowadays, they are all integrated in an ice resurfacer machine.

Tennis courts sometimes have squeegees to help keep them dry and control the flow of water.

== Other uses ==
Stiff-bladed squeegees are used in addition to margin trowels and grout floats to apply grout or adhesive when applying ceramic tiles to a surface.

Squeegees with hard rubber or metal blades are used in stencil printing to apply solder paste to printed circuit boards (PCBs).

Small, hand-held plastic and rubber wedges with an edge formed as a blade are used in signwriting for the application of vinyl sheeting to decrease the possibility of air pockets. Signwriters' squeegees come in different models, some of which do not have handles, but are approximately the size and shape of a credit card.

Automobile squeegees are used in some universities to clean chalkboards.

During the September 11 attacks in 2001, Polish window washer Jan Demczur used a squeegee as an improvised drywall cutter to free himself and five others from an elevator shaft in the World Trade Center in New York City. The squeegee is now currently on display at the Smithsonian.

=== In popular media ===
- The idea of a squeegee has been used by Associate Professor Burkard Polster of Monash University, to illustrate the mathematical Kakeya needle problem.
- It is claimed that comedian Bill Hicks used the phrase "Squeegee Your Third Eye" frequently in his acts.
- The "Squeegee Weegee Gazette" is the official periodical of the Sausalito Yacht Club.
- "Weegee" is the pseudonym of the photographer Arthur (Usher) Fellig. One possible origin of his pseudonym is that it refers to his skills as a darkroom assistant (such an assistant is sometimes called "squeegee boy").

== See also ==
- Cleret
- Squeegee man
- Strigil
- Doctor blade
