= Component placement =

Component placement is an electronics manufacturing process that places electrical components precisely on printed circuit boards (PCBs) to create electrical interconnections between functional components and the interconnecting circuitry in the PCBs (leads-pads). The component leads must be accurately immersed in the solder paste previously deposited on the PCB pads. The next step after component placement is soldering.

== Placement inputs ==
- Flexible placer, chip shooter, and other specialized machines.
- PWB with solder print.
- Components supplied by feeders.
- Computer files: computer program controls location of each component on the PWB (X, Y and angular theta), feeder inventory levels, placement machine vacuum holder capability, automatic component realignment, placement accuracy, vision systems, and transportation of PCBs through the line.

== Placement process ==
Basic placement sequence generally includes: board indexing, board registration, fiducial vision alignment, component pick-up, component centering/vision inspection, component placement and board indexing. Component pick-up, component centering/vision inspection, component placement are repeated for each component. Sometimes, adhesive dispensing and on-line electrical verification are also included in the sequence.

Through the process of board indexing, the stencil-printed PWB is loaded to the appropriate position. Fiducial marks, also known as fiducial markers, provide common measurable points for all steps in the assembly process. There are many types of fiducials. Global fiducials are used to locate the position of all features on an individual printed circuit board. When multiple boards are processed as a panel, the global fiducials may also be referred to as panel fiducials if used to locate the circuits from the panel datum. Local fiducials are used to locate the position of an individual land pattern or component that may require more precise location, such as a 0.02 in (0.51 mm) pitch QFP.

Board is located by identify global fiducials on the PWB. Then the feeders pick up and center the components at a known distance from the component. Higher placement accuracy requires help from local fiducials visualized by optical or laser sensors. Vacuum pickup head removes components from feeders. In the end, the component is placed at the correct X, Y and theta location with all leads ion the correct pads in contact with solder paste. The PWBs with all components correctly placed will then move to the reflow process.

There are three primary attributes that shall be considered in the component placement system: accuracy, speed and flexibility. Accuracy involves the aspects of resolution, placement accuracy and repeatability. Speed involves the aspects of equipment placement rate, de-rating strategy and production through-put. Placement rate is determined by machine type and the distance between components on a board. Flexibility involves the aspects of component variety, number of feeders and PCB size range.

== Types of pick and placement machines ==
A pick and placement machine is a robotic style machine that places some variety of types of components. It includes features such as: component pickup feeder locations, vacuum pickup, vision system, automatic component realignment, repeatable placement accuracy, and transportation system for PCBs.

The pick and place machine is often the most important piece of manufacturing equipment for placing components reliably and accurately enough to meet throughput requirements in a cost-effective manner. Typically, surface mount pick and place equipment, including a full complement of feeders constitute about 50% of the total capital investment required for a medium volume surface mount manufacturing line.

There are two major types of pick and placement machine:

=== Chip shooter ===
Chip shooters are being used for as much as 90% of the most common components, like passives and small actives. Chip shooters are fast (20,000 to 80,000 per hour, can be as fast as 100,000 per hour) with a relatively low accuracy (generally 70 μm). As a result, chip shooters are not used for placing active components, which require better accuracy. There are three major types of chip shooters: stationary turret, overhead gantry, and revolver head.

=== Flexible placer ===
Comparing to chip shooters, flexible placers are slow (6,000 to 40,000 per hour) with a high accuracy (as low as 25 μm). As a result, flexible placers are being used to place complex and high I/O active components like QFPs as higher performance I/O components generally require higher accuracy. There are three major types of flexible placer: overhead gantry, revolver head and split-axis. Chip shooters and flexible placers are typically combined to use and they can take account of nearly 65% of the total assembly line cost.

== Types of placement heads ==
=== Overhead gantry ===
Overhead gantry-style positioning system's placement head is mounted on a gantry beam (X-axis). During the sequence, the beam moves perpendicular to the direction of the placement head movement, which offers two degrees of freedom (X and Y alignment) in a plane parallel to the machine table. The PCB and feeders keep stationary during placement. The PCB is located on the table by identifying global and local fiducials through a vision system. This placement head moves along the axis beams to pick components from a feeder, and then moves into position to place the components. A vacuum nozzle on the placement head moves up and down vertically to provide Z-axis and rotates in the horizontal plane to provide theta angular alignment. Sometimes a secondary vision system is also applied to check the correctness and alignment of the components after pick-up and before placement. As the PCB and feeders remain stationary in the placement sequence, the additional sources of positional inaccuracy are eliminated. Overhead gantry-style machine has the best placement accuracy among all types and is utilized by flexible placers exclusively. It offers greater flexibility and accuracy, but cannot match the speeds of other styles. Machines with multiple gantries can achieve faster speed.

=== Stationary turret/fixed turret ===
Stationary turret system has a relatively higher speed due to a series of identical heads rotating on a single turret. The feeder moves in the X direction to a fixed pickup location. As many as 36 vacuum nozzles around the perimeter of the rotating turret provide Z and theta alignment. Turret rotates multiple heads between pickup and placement locations. The PCB moves in X and Y direction under the rotating heads, pausing beneath the correct placement location. Comparing to a gantry head, the simultaneous movements of feeders and PCBs greatly improve the average placement rate. Because passive components do not demand a great placement accuracy, it is exclusively applied in chip shooters. Stationary turret system has a limitation of requiring large footprint for the moving feeder bank (footprint =2*total feeder length). The possibility of dislodging components due to the moving board mechanism is another limitation.

=== Revolver head ===
This system combines the speed advantage of stationary turret and the footprint advantage of overhead gantry. It was first being used by Siemens. The stationary turret with multiple pickup heads performs simultaneous functions while moving components from pickup to placement locations. Multiple revolvers are mounted on independent gantries to pick multiple parts from stationary feeders before moving to the PWB. The moving turret and multiple turrets offer higher placement speed and make revolver head can be used in both chip shooters and flexible placers. But utilizing it in flexible placers had limited success in reality.

=== Split-axis ===
In a split-axis system, the placement head moves in the X, theta and Z directions, while the PWB moves in the Y direction. As two moving components are involved, split-axis machine slightly more difficult to achieve high accuracy comparing to the overhead gantry machine. But it greatly improves placement speed.

== Vacuum nozzle and grippers ==
Vacuum nozzles are commonly used for handling all the components during the placement operations. There are a variety of vacuum nozzle sizes for different component sizes. For handling small components, positive pressure is often supplied in addition to vacuum at the moment of placement so that the component would be completely release from the nozzle.

In addition to vacuum nozzles, mechanical grippers could be required for handling of some odd-shaped parts. Self-centering mechanical grippers allow simultaneous pickup and automatic centering without the need for a vacuum. A pair of tweezers-type grippers would hold the part while centering it along one axis. However, there are some disadvantages with self-centering mechanical grippers: it is possible that the gripper edges could have contact with epoxy or solder paste. In addition, extra space is required between the components to accommodate the grippers.

== Types of feeders ==
Feeders are used to feed components to the moveable pick-up mechanism of placement machines. Feeders move individual components to a fixed location and also assist the pickup head in removing components from their packaging. As the flexibility and placement rate of systems has increased, so have the demands made on the component feeder systems. A high product mix and correspondingly small batch sizes result in frequent feeder changing. Quick feeder changeover is required in order to minimize machine down-time, so feeders must be designed for fast replacement. Here are some of the common types of feeders.

=== Tape and reel feeders ===
Tape and reel feeder is the most commonly used feeder design. Tape-on-reel feeders are loaded with a reel, which is placed onto a reel-reception. The peel-off carriage pulls the reel tape forward until the next component is in the pick-up position. When the sensor indicates that the component is at the pickup position, a holder moves down and locks-down the tape. Tape feeders are most suitable for placing large quantities of identical small components. Tape feeders come in a variety of sizes and can be used for Small-outline integrated circuits (SOICs) and plastic leaded chip carriers (PLCCs). The main disadvantage of the tape format is the inability to recycle the empty tapes. Especially in the case of small chip devices, the tape waste material weighs several times more than the packaged components. Moreover, there is additional cost for placing small inexpensive components in tape.

=== Stick feeders ===
Stick feeders are designed for components packed in linear sticks (small ICs issued in low volumes). Components are moved to the pick-up location by gravity or vibration. It feeds any ordinary SOP, SOT and PLCC which are packaged in stick form. Due to the various possibilities of adjusting the size of the lane, the feeder can easily be adapted to many different component types.

=== Matrix tray feeders ===
Matrix tray feeders are used for large, delicate or expensive components. They are developed out of the necessity for handling quad flat packs and fine pitch components. These hold the components securely without damaging the fragile leads. An entire matrix-profiled tray of components are moved to bring rows or individual components to pick-up location. This process is often slower compared to tape feeders as the components fed in matrix trays often require higher level of placement accuracy.

=== Bulk feeders ===
Bulk feeders can handle chip style components that are used in large numbers. A bulk feeder usually dispenses components, which are stored in a bulk case, using a unique rotary positioning mechanism to position and orient components and feed them to the pick-up position using a stainless steel belt. They are cheaper compared with tape feeders as there are no tape packing, but traditionally the performance of bulk feeders is problematic because of construction and debris created during the feeding process.

=== Direct die feeder ===
The direct die feeders are mostly used for flip-chip or chip-on board. Direct die feeder could eliminate separate and dedicated production lines for SMT, bare die, and flip chip by combining them into one. It could also enabling total assembly solutions with much higher speed and flexibility, resulting in lower cost per placement. In addition, it could eliminate costly processes such as intermediate die transfer into pocketed tape, surf-tape, or waffle packs prior to placement.

== Placement speed ==
The placement speed is influenced by many factors in the placement process.

=== Feeder breakdown ===
The placement speed is affected by the line downtime. Since feeder problems are the a major source of downtime, the repair and maintenance of feeders are crucial for the component placement operations. Here are the common ways to detect feeder problems:

- The feeder doesn't achieve the desired output or the output drops after being at the desired level. The feeder has low or reduced output.
- The feeder operates noisily only during certain periods.
- The feeder operates but has reduced output.
- The feeder operates noisily but achieves normal output.
- The feeder's amplitude gradually fades or slowly decreases.
- The flow of material discharging from the feeder is turbulent, creating inconsistent flow to the process.
- The feeder output is inconsistent, creating feed rate fluctuations.

=== Placement system set up ===
All on-line setup reduces the capacity and improper setup procedures could also create additional line downtime. No boards could be produced if the placement system is not set up. Due to the complexity of the feeder set up and changeover process, it is important for operators to be aware of the variety types of feeder mechanisms. There are additional tools that could be implemented to assist the placement set up, such as roll-up feeder carts, just-in-time (JIT) methods and smart feeders.

=== Placement speed derating ===
In practice it is not possible to obtain the quoted theoretical maximum throughput rate for machines in a placement system. It is necessary to derate the theoretical numbers to obtain realistic values, due to unexpected downtime, board load and unload time and machine configuration. Other factors include PWB size, component mix, and the requirement for more complex vision recognition for fine-pitch components. There are many techniques of derating. Global derating considers system-wide stops, slow-downs and set ups as well as machine factors. To calculate the amount of global or system derating, one should take the average of the number of total components placed per hour in a long period (i.e. an entire product shift). Regularly scheduled stops should be included when determining the level of global derating the system requires. Rigorous derating, which considers each piece of equipment in service for a particular product individually, must be conducted by specific machine model for the line balancing. Rigorous derating values are necessary for full optimization of the process.

== See also ==
- Bill of materials
