= FirstDefender =

FirstDefender is a handheld liquid and solid chemical identification instrument which uses a method of analysis called Raman spectroscopy. It is designed for use by first responders, homeland security, law enforcers and forensic chemistry personnel for immediate identification of unknown solids, liquids, and mixtures. This includes narcotics, explosives, white powders, chemical weapons, WMDs and toxic industrial chemicals. The detector identifies substances even through the walls of their containers. It is used by some airport officials in the United States to detect liquid explosives.

It won the Bronze medal in the 2006 International Design Excellence Awards in the Medical & Scientific Products Category.
