= Fiducial marker =

Reference point inserted in an image

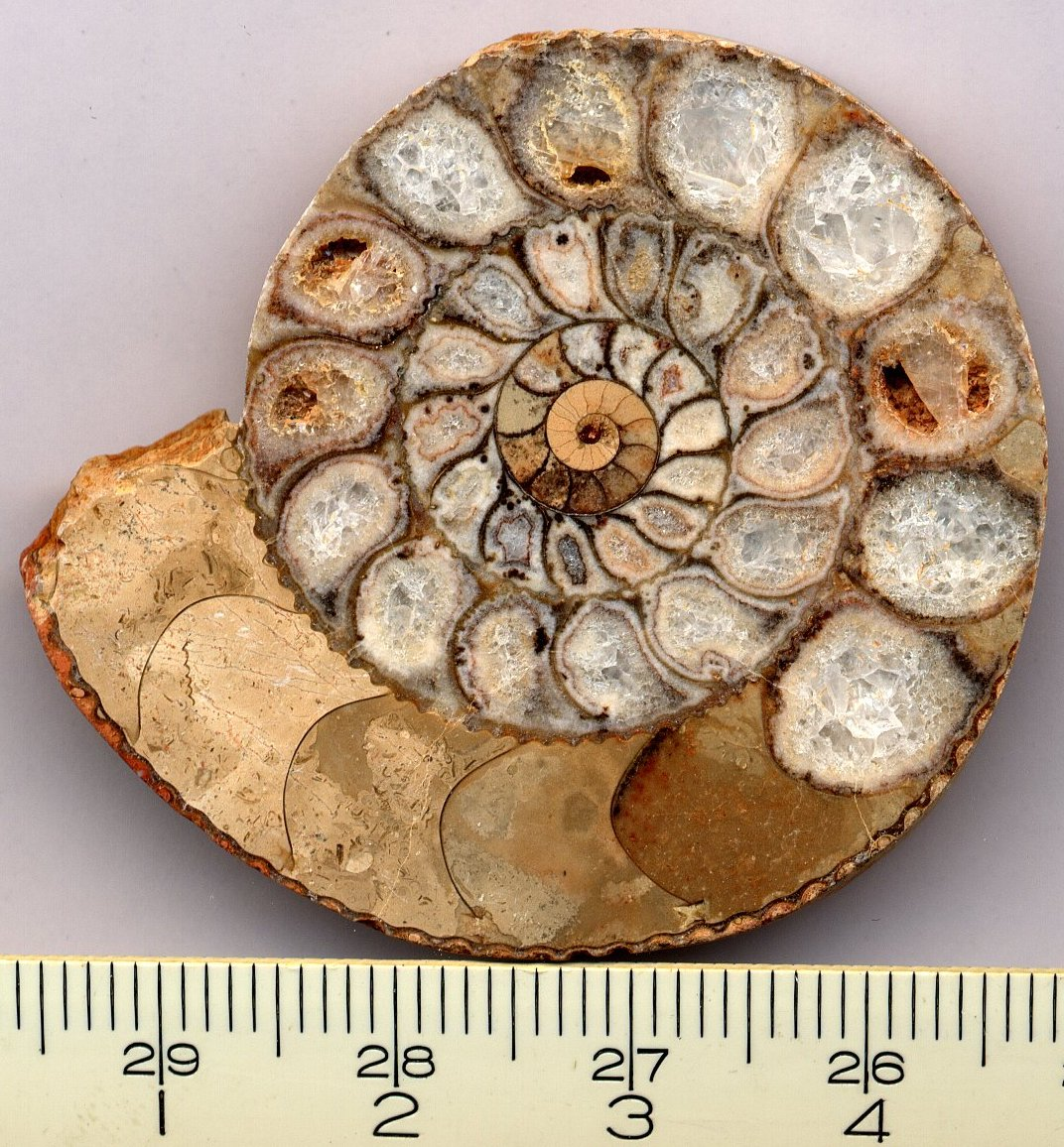
A ruler used as a fiducial marker

A fiducial marker or fiducial is an object placed in the field of view of an image for use as a point of reference or a measure. It may be either something placed into or on the imaging subject, or a mark or set of marks in the reticle of an optical instrument.

== Applications ==
=== Microscopy ===
In high-resolution optical microscopy, fiducials can be used to actively stabilize the field of view. Stabilization to better than 0.1 nm is achievable.

=== Physics ===
In physics, 3D computer graphics, and photography, fiducials are reference points: fixed points or lines within a scene to which other objects can be related or against which objects can be measured.

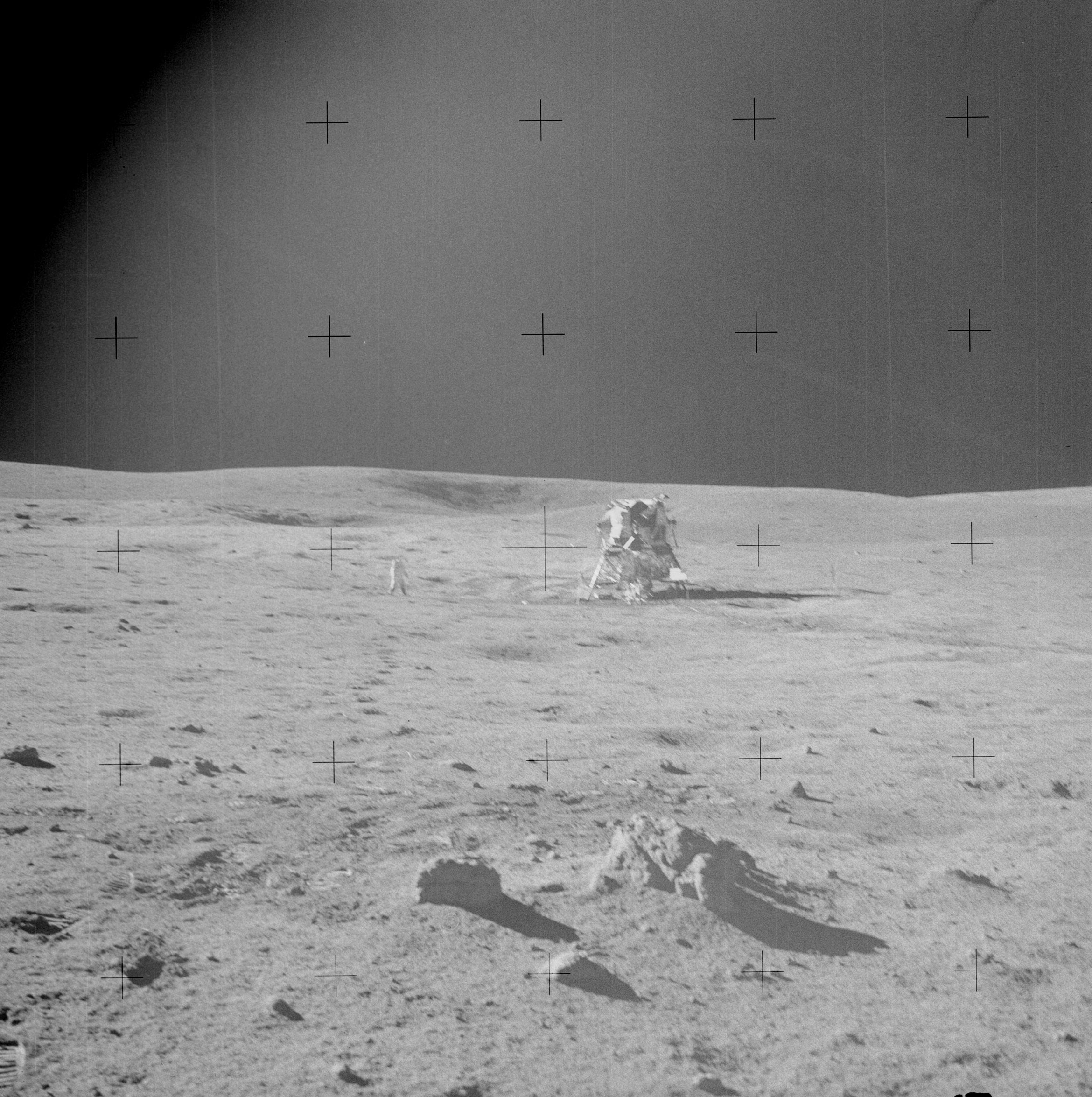
On NASA photographs, crosshair reticles on a Réseau plate enable detection and correction of distortions caused by the processing and handling of physical photographs.

Cameras outfitted with Réseau plates produce these reference marks (also called Réseau crosses) and are commonly used by NASA. Such marks are closely related to the timing marks used in optical mark recognition.

=== Geographical survey ===
Airborne geophysical surveys also use the term "fiducial" as a sequential reference number in the measurement of various geophysical instruments during a survey flight. This application of the term evolved from air photo frame numbers that were originally used to locate geophysical survey lines in the early days of airborne geophysical surveying. This method of positioning has since been replaced by GPS, but the term "fiducial" continues to be used as the time reference for data measured during flights.

=== Augmented reality ===
Comparison of augmented reality fiducial markers for computer vision

In applications of augmented reality, fiducials help resolve several problems of integration between the real world view and the synthetic images that augment it. Fiducials of known pattern and size can serve as real world anchors of location, orientation and scale. They can establish the identity of the scene or objects within the scene. For example, a fiducial printed on one page of an augmented reality popup book would identify the page to allow the system to select the augmentation content. It would also serve to moor the coordinates of the augmented content to the three dimensional location, orientation and scale of the open book, helping to create a stable and accurate fusion of real and synthetic imagery.

A slightly more complex example would be multiple fiducials, each attached to an individual piece in an augmented reality board game.

=== Metrology ===
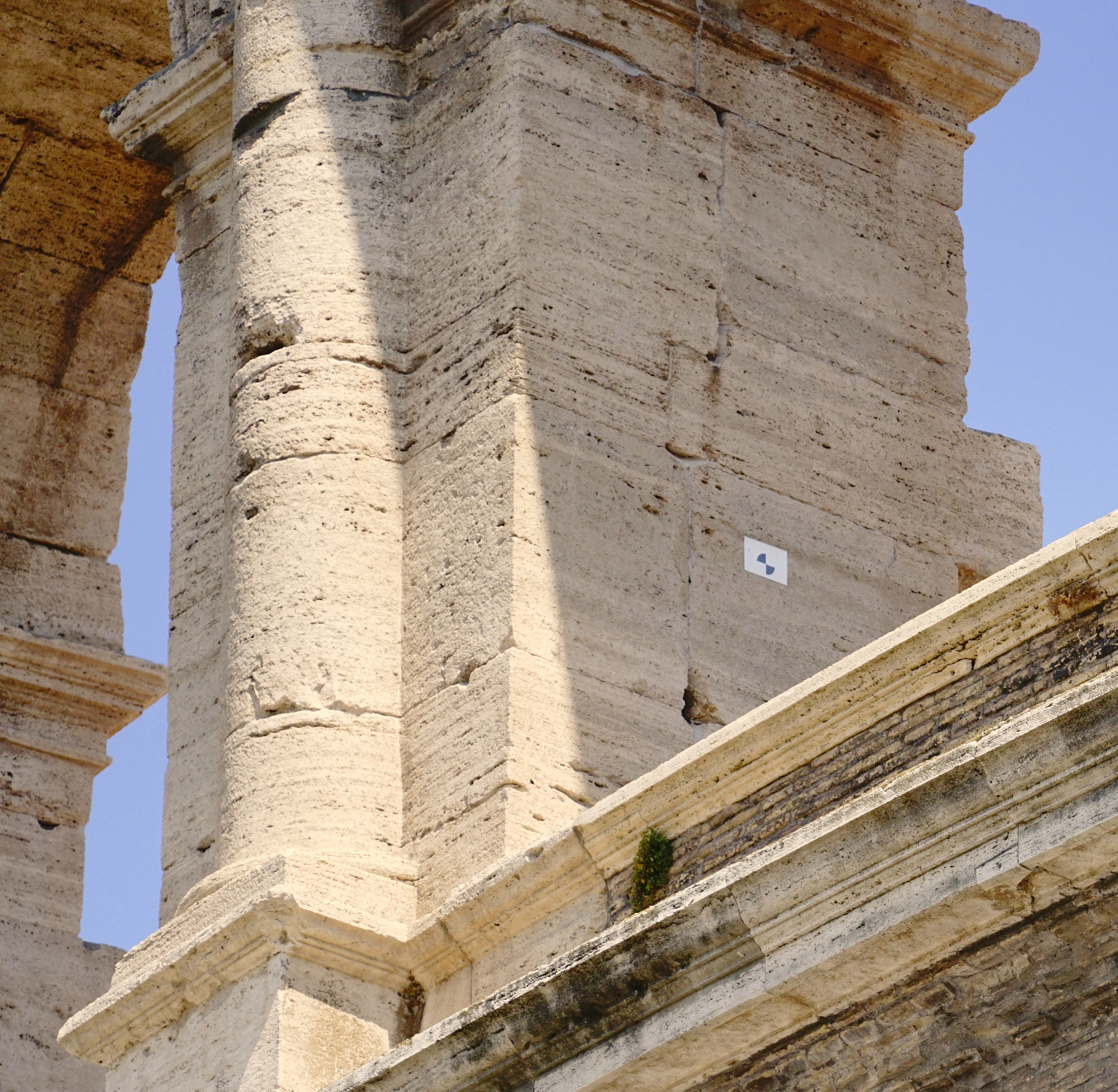
Fiducial marker present on an arch of the Colosseum

The appearance of markers in images may act as a reference for image scaling, or may allow the image and physical object, or multiple independent images, to be correlated. By placing fiducial markers at known locations in a subject, the relative scale in the produced image may be determined by comparison of the locations of the markers in the image and subject. In applications such as photogrammetry, the fiducial marks of a surveying camera may be set so that they define the principal point, in a process called "collimation". This would be a creative use of how the term collimation is conventionally understood.

=== Fiducial marker sets ===
QR codes include four fiducial markers; the three large "finder patterns" (in this image, the white squares surrounded by black ones), and the fourth smaller one in the bottom right.

Some barcode readers can estimate the translation, orientation, and vertical depth of a known-size barcode relative to the barcode reader.

Some sets of fiducial markers are specifically designed to allow rapid, low-latency detection of 6D position estimation (3D location and 3D orientation) and identity of hundreds of unique fiducial markers. For example, the ArUco markers, the WhyCon marker, WhyCode markers, "amoeba" reacTIVision fiducials, the d-touch fiducials, or the TRIP circular barcode tags (ringcodes).

=== Medical imaging ===
Fiducial markers are used in a wide range of medical imaging applications. Images of the same subject produced with two different imaging systems may be correlated by placing a fiducial marker in the area imaged by both systems. In this case, a marker which is visible in the images produced by both imaging modalities must be used. By this method, functional information from SPECT or positron emission tomography can be related to anatomical information provided by magnetic resonance imaging (MRI).

Similarly, fiducial points established during MRI can be correlated with brain images generated by magnetoencephalography to localize the source of brain activity. Such fiducial points or markers are often created in tomographic images such as computed tomography, magnetic resonance and positron emission tomography images using devices such as the N-localizer and Sturm-Pastyr localizer.

=== Electrocardiography ===
In electrocardiography (ECG), fiducial points are landmarks on the ECG complex such as the isoelectric line (PQ junction), and onset of individual waves such as PQRST.

=== Cell biology ===
In processes that involve following a labelled molecule as it is incorporated in some larger polymer, such markers can be used to follow the dynamics of growth/shrinkage of the polymer, as well as its movement. Commonly used fiducial markers are fluorescently labelled monomers of bio-polymers. The task of measuring and quantifying what happens to these is borrowed from methods in physics and computational imaging like speckle imaging.

=== Social insect tracking ===
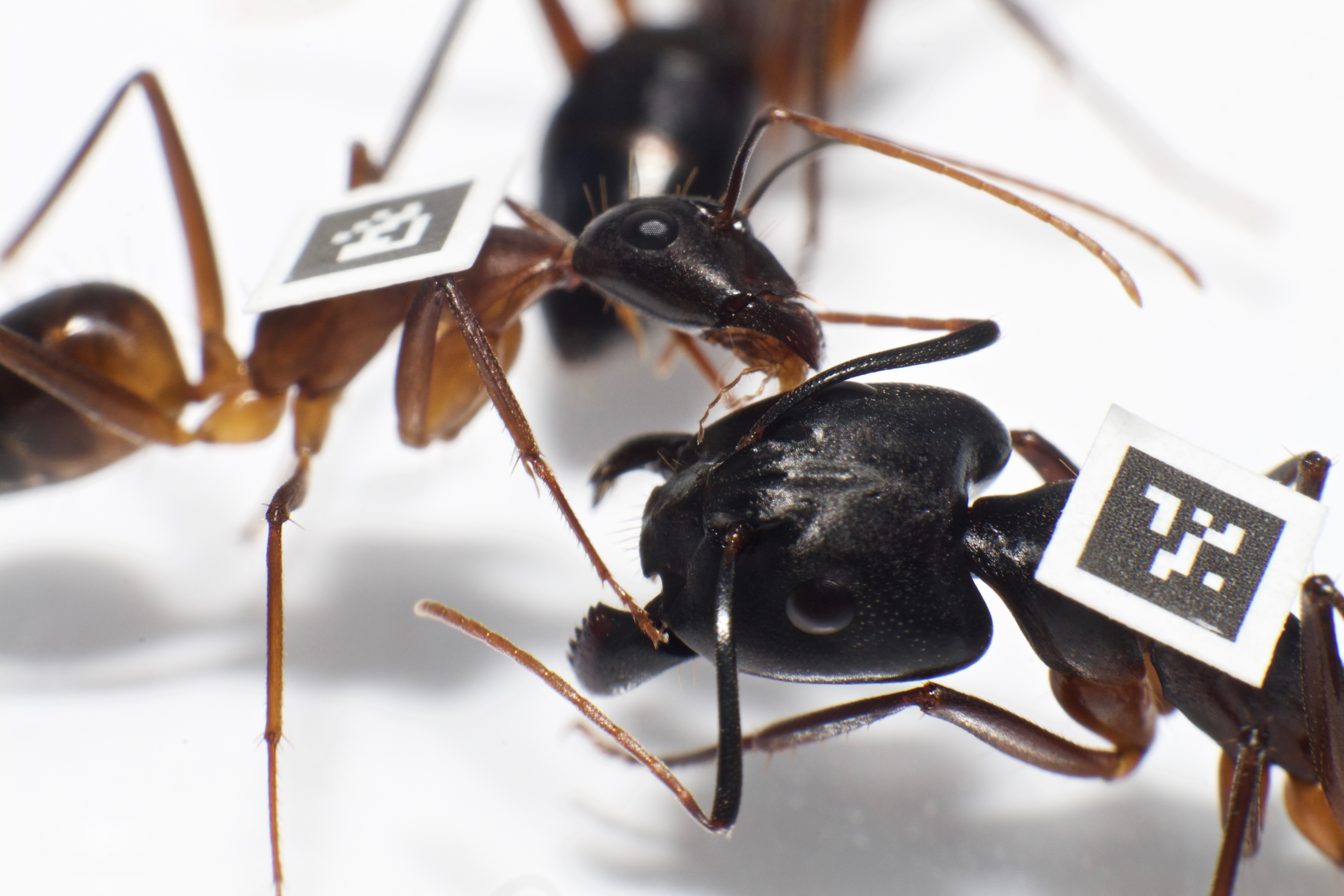
Ant workers tagged with fiducial markers

Automated behavioural tracking systems are used to study the organisation of social insect colonies, and the behaviour of individual colony members. These systems combine fiducial markers and machine vision to output the location and orientation of colony members multiple times per second and have, among other insights, revealed the social network structure of ant Camponotus fellah.

=== Radiotherapy ===
In radiotherapy and radiosurgical systems, fiducial points are landmarks in the tumour to facilitate correct targets for treatment. In neuronavigation, a "fiducial spatial coordinate system" is used as a reference, for use in neurosurgery, to describe the position of specific structures within the head or elsewhere in the body. Such fiducial points or landmarks are often created in magnetic resonance imaging and computed tomography images by using the N-localizer or Sturm-Pastyr localizer.

=== Printed circuit boards ===
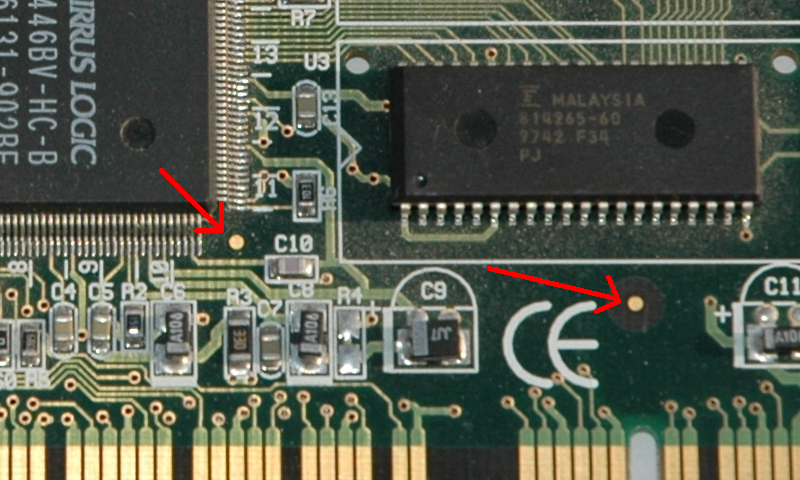
Fiducial marker for a chip to the left and the whole PCB beneath

In printed circuit board (PCB) manufacturing, fiducial marks, also known as circuit pattern recognition marks, allow SMT placement equipment to accurately locate and place parts on boards. These devices locate the circuit pattern by providing common measurable points. They are usually made by leaving a circular area of the board bare from solder-mask coating. Inside this area is a circle exposing the copper plating beneath. This center metallic disc can be solder-coated, gold-plated or otherwise treated, although bare copper is most common if not a current-carrying contact. Alternatively, it is possible to use clear solder-mask lacquer to cover the fiducials. In order to minimize rounding errors it was good practice to place fiducials in the same grid (or some multiple of it) that was used to place the parts, however, this isn't always possible on high-density boards nor is it a requirement any more with modern high-precision machines.

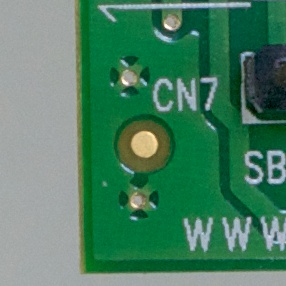
A gold-plated circular fiducial marker

Most placement machines are fed boards for assembly by a rail conveyor, with the board being clamped down in the assembly area of the machine. Each board will clamp slightly differently than the others, and the variance—which will generally be only tenths of a millimeter—is sufficient to ruin a board without proper calibration. Consequently, a typical PCB will have multiple fiducials to allow placement robots to precisely determine the board's orientation. By measuring the location of the fiducials relative to the board plan stored in the machine's memory, the machine can reliably compute the degree to which parts must be moved relative to the plan, called offset, to ensure accurate placement.

Using three fiducials enables the machine to determine PCB offset in both the X and Y axes, as well as to determine if the board has rotated during clamping, allowing the machine to rotate parts to be placed to match. Fiducials are a key component of the Gerber file that is used in the manufacture of circuit boards on a SMT line. Such fiducials are also called global fiducials. Global fiducials are also used in conjunction with stencil printing. Without them the printer would not print the solder paste in exact alignment with the pads. Parts requiring a very high degree of placement precision, such as ball grid array packages, may have additional local fiducials near the package placement area of the board to further fine-tune the targeting. Local fiducial, however, cannot be used in the stencil printing process.

Conversely, low end, low-precision boards may only have two fiducials, or use fiducials applied as part of the screen printing process applied to most circuit boards. Some very low-end boards may use the plated mounting screw holes as fiducials, although this yields very low accuracy.

For prototyping and small batch production runs, the use of a fiducial camera can greatly improve the process of board fabrication. By automatically locating fiducial markers, the camera automates board alignment. This helps with front to back and multilayer applications, eliminating the need for set pins.

=== Robotic construction ===
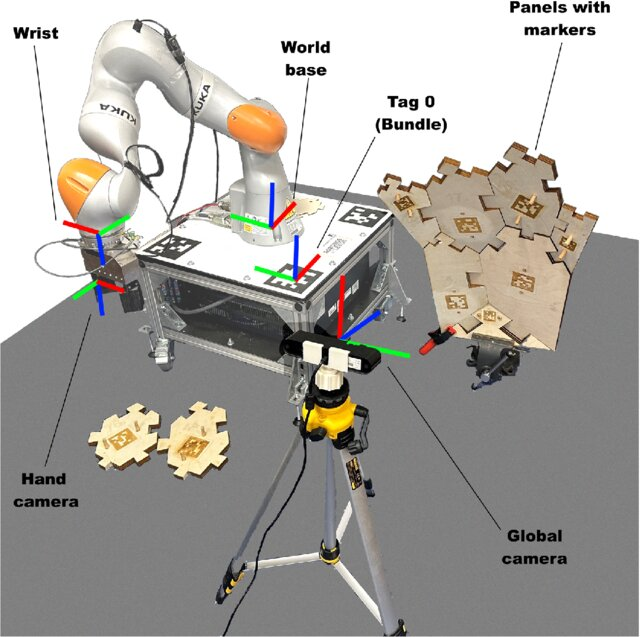
Multi-camera tracking configuration using fused visual fiducial markers and 3D point cloud data for component alignment.

In the use of construction robots, visual fiducial markers are utilized to manage the spatial tracking and automated assembly of prefabricated building components by robotic manipulators. Because unstructured construction environments present unique operational challenges, such as airborne dust, varying ambient illumination, and potential camera line-of-sight occlusions, reliance on standard visual fiducials alone can lead to targeting failures. To establish tracking security under these variables, sensory systems can fuse data from high-density 3D point cloud inputs with localized visual fiducial tracking arrays, facilitating reliable spatial configuration and component alignment during robotic assembly operations.

=== Printing ===
In color printing, fiducials—also called "registration black"—are used at the edge of the cyan, magenta, yellow and black (CMYK) printing plates so that they can be correctly aligned with each other.

== "Banana for scale" ==
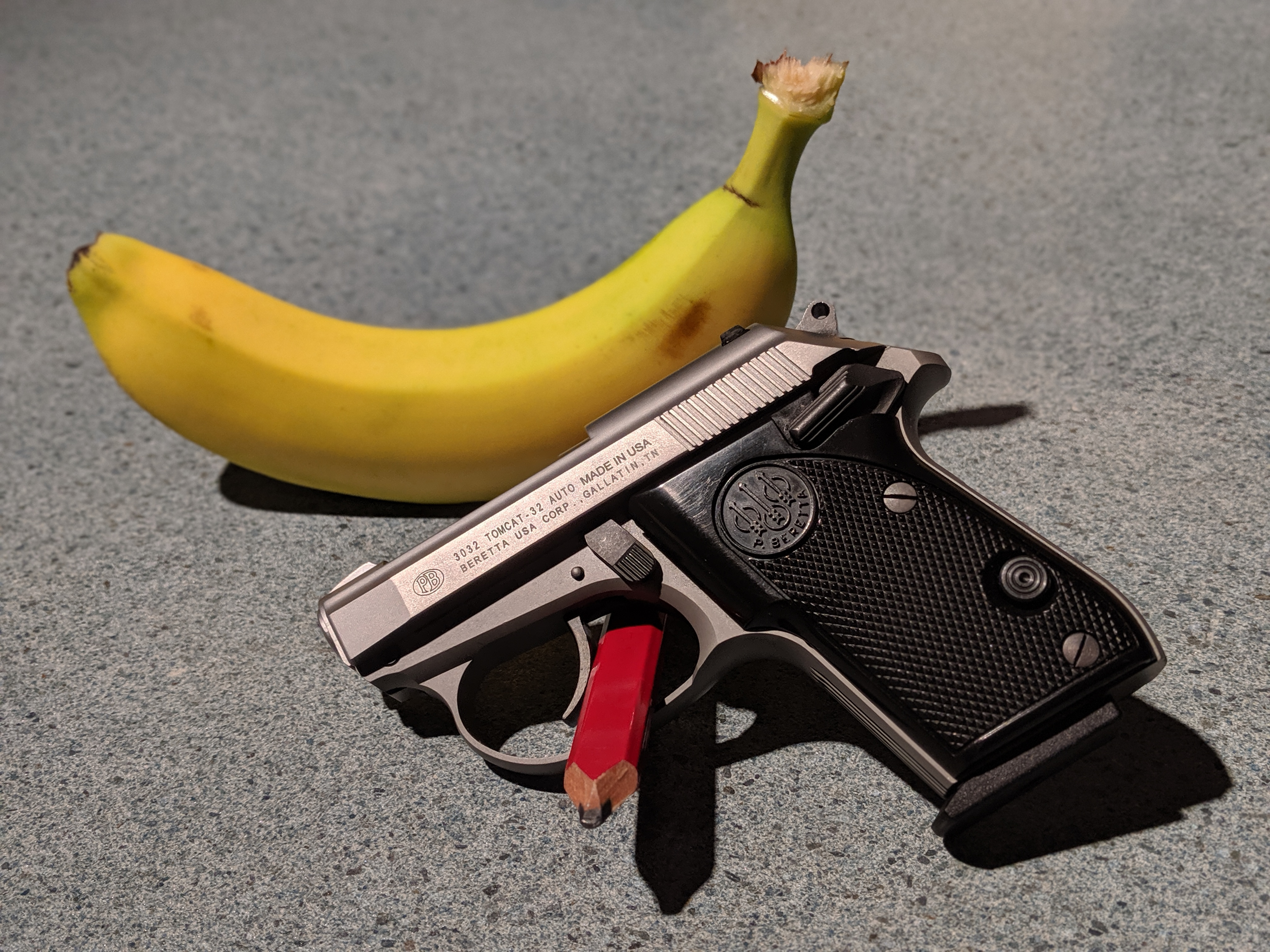
A Beretta 3032 Tomcat with a banana for scale

"Banana for scale" refers to an Internet meme involving using a banana as a fiducial marker. The meme began in August 2010, where a man posted to Facebook a picture of a safe with a banana beside it. From there, the meme spread primarily via Reddit; The Daily Dot remarked that "[the meme] had become a hilarious game with redditors try to one up each other." In 2024, the mobile Reddit app tracked the length of how much the user scrolled through content measured in number of banana lengths, including awarding users with achievements for scrolling various amounts of bananas. In 2024 SpaceX had a banana toy printed with the text "(for scale)" float in Starship flight test 6. Printed on the vehicle was also an anthropomorphic banana character, holding a life-sized banana for scale.

== See also ==
- Secchi disk
- Landmark point
