= Sohrab Vossoughi =

Iranian businessman

- Born: June 25, 1956 (age 70); Tehran, Iran

Sohrab Vossoughi is an Iranian-American product designer and founder of Ziba Design, a design and innovation consultancy based in Portland, Oregon.

== Early life and education ==
Sohrab was born in Tehran, Iran in 1956. He moved to the United States in 1971. After studying mechanical engineering for three years, he switched to study industrial design. He graduated from San Jose State University's Department of Industrial Design in 1979.

== Career ==
Vossoughi joined Hewlett-Packard Corp. In 1982, he began independent consulting for startup companies in Portland, Oregon. By 1984, he had launched a product development firm he named ZIBA Design.

Ziba Design worked on products including Umpqua Bank branches, Herbal Essences in 2006, Heinz Ketchup in 2012, and the Readymop for Clorox in 2002. He built a 3-story 77,450 square feet (7,195 m^{2}) office for Ziba in 2009 for $20 million at 810 NW Marshall St, replacing their previous office at 334 NW 11th Ave. Both were owned by Vossoughi's LLCs, but Umpqua Bank took the building into receivership after defaulting in 2022, placing it under trustee Kenneth Eiler. The 11th Ave building was builtin 1925 and contained 22,000 square feet (2,000 m^{2}) on three stories and became the home of Cloudability until 2019.
