= NewDealDesign =

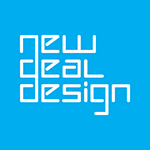
- Company type: Private
- Industry: Industrial design; Strategic design; Interaction design; Package design; Mechanical engineering
- Founded: 2000
- Headquarters: San Francisco, California, United States
- Key people: Gadi Amit
- Website: www.newdealdesign.com

NewDealDesign is a San Francisco-based design studio led by founder and principal designer, Gadi Amit. The studio consists of industrial, graphic, and interaction designers as well as mechanical engineers who helps develop new technology products.

== History ==
NewDealDesign was founded in 2000 by Gadi Amit and Chris Lenart. Prior to founding the agency, Amit was Vice President of Design at Frog Design in San Francisco. He began his career in design at Scailex, an Israel-based design firm, after graduating from the Bezalel Academy of Arts and Design in Jerusalem.

== Design and Growth ==
Many of NewDealDesign's projects are consumer electronics and wearable technology for companies, including Fitbit, Google, Intel, Dell, Lytro, Whistle and Sproutling.

The 2003 introduction of the PalmOne Zire 21, one of the fastest-selling PDAs of the early 2000s, gave NewDealDesign its breakthrough success. The product design was recognized by Bloomberg Businessweek for “expanding its appeal beyond the techie and corporate communities to the broader consumer market, especially women and first-time buyers.” In 2004, the NewDeal-designed Netgear Platinum II.
