= International Design Excellence Awards =

Award program

The International Design Excellence Awards (IDEA) is an award program previously co-sponsored by BusinessWeek magazine, and in 2010 Fast Company magazine and the Industrial Designers Society of America (IDSA). According to the IDSA, IDEA "is dedicated to fostering business and public understanding of the importance of industrial design excellence to the quality of life and economy". Every year, designers and corporations submit entries into the competition in many categories. The program was established in 1980. The IDEA winners are honored at annual ceremonies (such as the International Council of Societies of Industrial Design (ICSID) / IDSA CONNECTING '07 World Design Congress in San Francisco, California) and awarded with a statue made by New York firm, Society Awards. The name was changed from Industrial Design Excellence Awards to International Design Excellence Awards in 2007.

The judges are chosen from different design firms and corporations throughout the world using the following criteria:

- Innovation: (design, experience, manufacturing)
- Benefit to User: (performance, comfort, safety, ease of use, usability, user interface, ergonomics, universal function and access, quality of life, affordability)
- Responsibility: Benefit to society, environment, culture and economy, improved accessibility to a greater percentage of the population, improves education, meets basic needs of low income populations, reduces disease, improves competitiveness, raises wealth, improves the quality of life, supports cultural diversity, improves energy efficiency, durability, addresses product lifecycle effects on the environment, uses low impact materials and processes throughout lifecycle, designed for repair/reuse/recyclability, addresses issues of toxicity, reduced material usage and waste reduction
- Benefit to the client (profitability, increased sales, brand reputation, employee morale)
- Visual appeal and appropriate aesthetics
- Design Research: (usability, emotional factors, unmet needs) testing rigor and reliability)
- Design Strategy Category (internal factors and methods, strategic value and implementation)

== See also ==
- 2005 International Design Excellence Awards
- 2006 International Design Excellence Awards
