= Lunar Panoramic Photography - Apollo 16 =

NASA's Apollo Lunar Surface Journal (ALSJ) records the details of each mission's period on the lunar surface as a timeline of the activities undertaken, the dialogue between the crew and Mission Control, and the relevant documentary records. Each photograph taken on the mission is catalogued there and each panoramic photograph sequence is also recorded. This page tabulates the Apollo 16 panoramas and, where appropriate, provides updated representations of the panoramas blended using more recent technologies than the originals.

== Context ==
Apollo 16 was the second of Apollo's "J Missions" using an enhanced Lunar Module that was capable of supporting a 3-day stay on the lunar surface *and* the delivery of the Lunar Roving Vehicle (LRV or "Rover") to the surface to allow the crew to extend the range of their exploration and to provide remote TV coverage.

In terms of photography, Apollo 16's crew surpassed their predecessors on Apollo 15 in no short measure. 1800 frames were captured whilst on the lunar surface resulting in around 100 panoramic sequences. An interesting point that arises in the subsequent tables is the ratio of panoramas taken by the Commander (John Young) and the Lunar Module Pilot (Charlie Duke) - Duke takes around four times as many as his colleague and this 4:1 ratio is the highest across all the missions.

The Lunar Module (LM), Orion, landed with its door and ladder leg (AKA "+Z strut") pointing approximately due west. The Sun's elevation was around 22°-25° for EVA 1, 34°-38° for EVA 2, and 46°-49° for EVA 3.

The higher elevations of the Sun across the EVAs can be seen through the improvement in the quality of the panoramas; the Sun itself, and any resulting lens flair, is barely noticeable whereas it featured prominently in the earlier missions.

== Rover Panoramas (LVR Pans) ==
Charlie Duke is credited with inventing a new procedure during EVA 2; the "LRV Pan" or "Rover Pan" (also known as a "360"). The process of getting on and off of the rover was protracted due to the bulky suit and backpack that the astronauts wore, but Duke realised that by having Young drive the rover in a tight circle he could snap a panoramic sequence simply by pointing the camera straight ahead and continuously pressing the shutter button from his seated position ("click - click - click - click - click -click")

Although efficient in terms of time and effort, the approach presented some issues:-

- Panoramic sequences are best shot from a single position - in these cases the camera was moved (or was being moved) for each shot
- Every shot contains foreground items (the rover's TV camera and antenna) that impact on as much as 50% of each image
- The camera is subject to the movements and orientation of the rover
- Camera settings have to be changed "On the fly"

The first noted LRV Pan was the sequence AS16-115-18503 to 18511 - see "Timestamp 148:41:11" below. Empirical analysis suggests that the sequence is limited to AS16-115-18107 to 18511 and the result is shown below:-

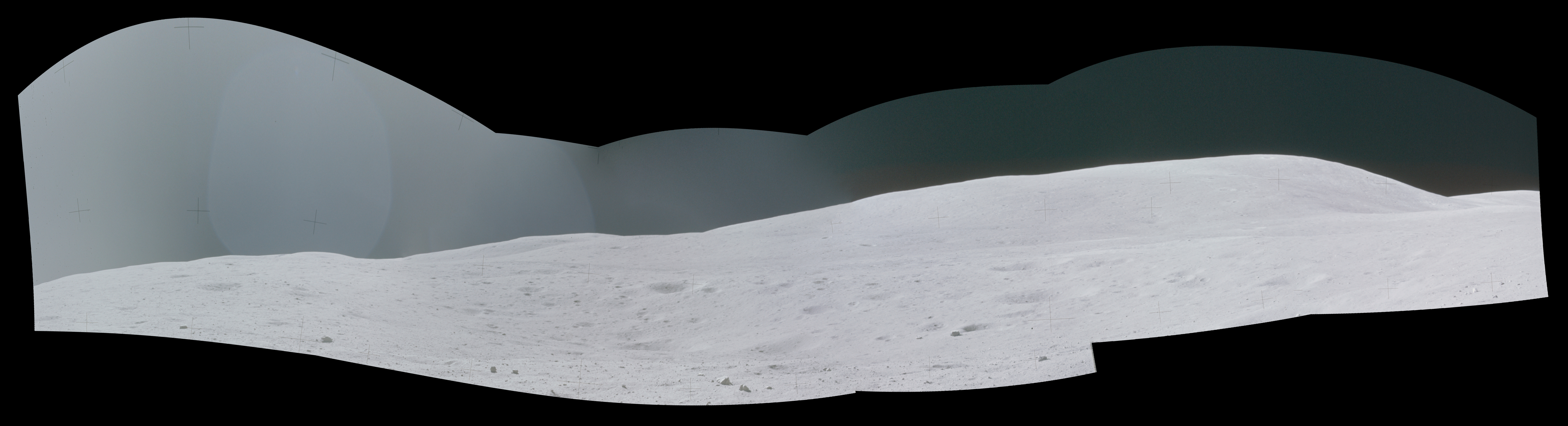
First recorded "LRC Pan" - Apollo 16 - AS16-115-18503-18511.jpg

== Non-EVA (LM-based) panoramas ==
By this, the fifth landing, the need for contingency photos taken from the Lunar Module was greatly reduced, so low in fact, that only one panorama was taken through each of the windows (and subsequently combined). No panoramas were taken from the LM between the EVAs or after the final return.

Table 16.1 Non-EVA panoramas
Mission	Time (MET)	EVA #	Title	Astronaut	Magazine	Type	Start Frame	End Frame	Source	Reference Panorama	Sourced Alternate	Updated Panorama	Notes
XVI	106:15:45	Pre-EVA	Post-Landing Window Pan	Young/Duke	113	Color	18296	18310	ALSJ			N/A	JSC2012e052597
XVI	106:15:45	Pre-EVA	Post-Landing Window Pan - CDR	Young	113	Color	18296	18303	ALSJ			N/A	Sub-panorama
XVI	106:15:45	Pre-EVA	Post-Landing Window Pan - LMP	Duke	113	Color	18304	18310	ALSJ			N/A	Sub-panorama

== EVA Panoramas - EVA 1 ==
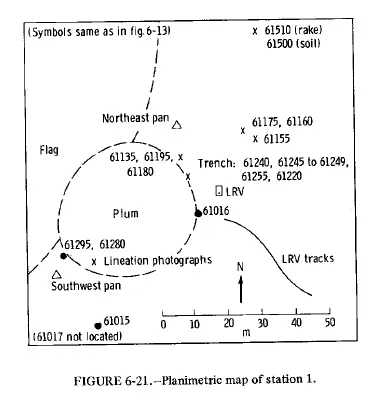

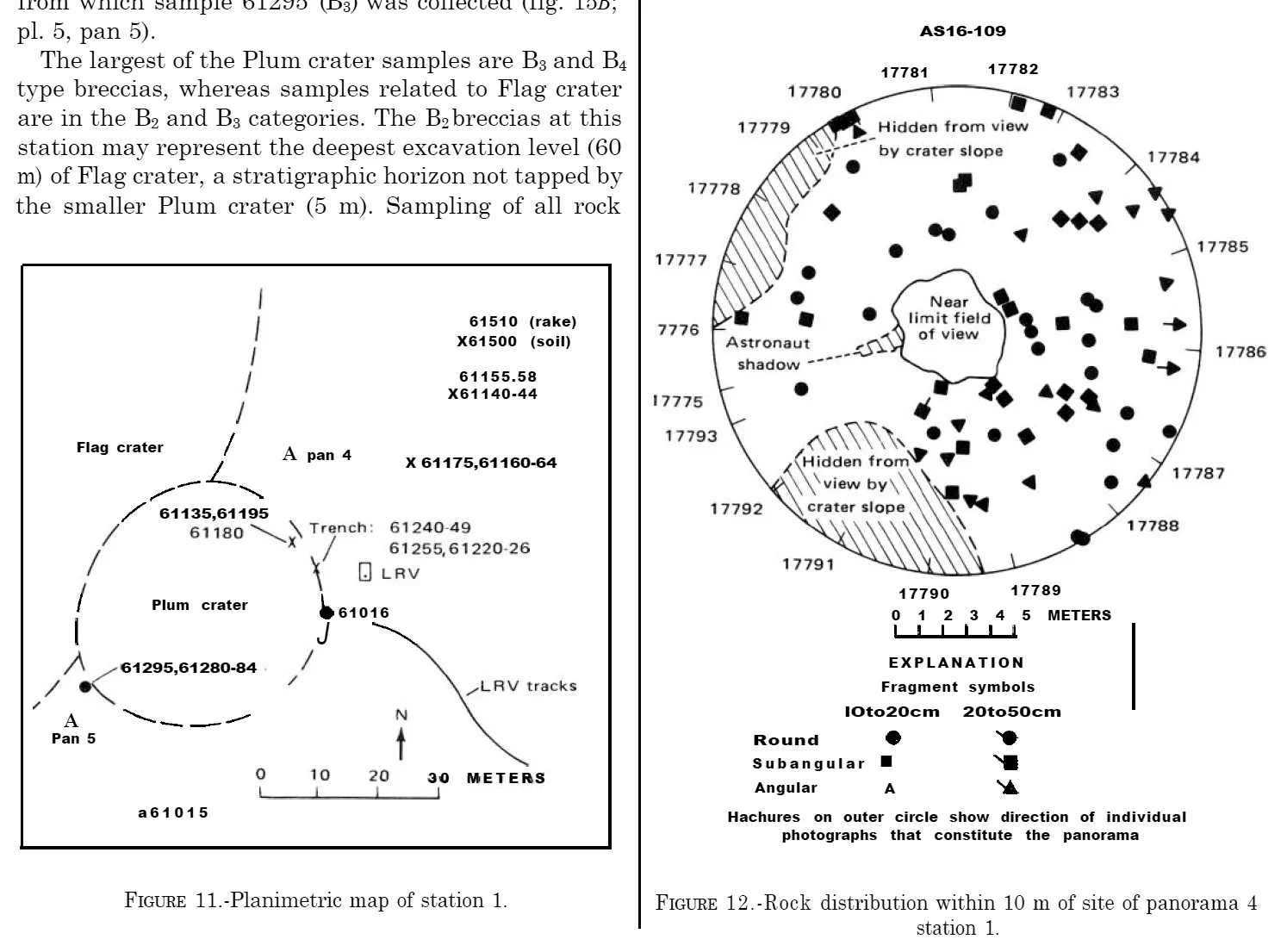

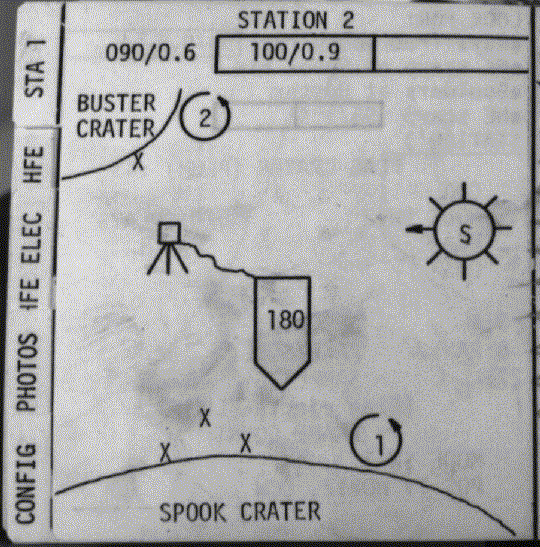

Table 16.2 EVA 1 panoramas
Mission	Time (MET)	EVA #	Title	Astronaut	Magazine	Type	Start Frame	End Frame	Source	Reference Panorama	ALSJ Alternate	Updated Panorama	Notes
XVI	119:33:46	EVA 1	LM 4 O'clock Pan	Duke	113	Color	18313	18330	ALSJ			N/A	
XVI	119:33:46	EVA 1	LM 4 O'clock Pan North	Duke	113	Color	18313	18322	ALSJ			N/A	Sub-panorama
XVI	119:33:46	EVA 1	LM 4 O'clock Pan South	Duke	113	Color	18324	18330	ALSJ			N/A	Sub-panorama
XVI	122:12:32	EVA 1	ALSEP Pan	Duke	113	Color	18349	18370	ALSJ			N/A	
XVI	122:12:32	EVA 1	ALSEP Pan North	Duke	113	Color	18349	18360	ALSJ			N/A	Sub-panorama
XVI	122:12:32	EVA 1	ALSEP Pan South	Duke	113	Color	18361	18370	ALSJ			N/A	Sub-panorama
XVI	122:58:02	EVA 1	Outbound Drive to Station 1 - Part 1	Duke	109	Monochrome	17747	17768	ALSJ	N/A		N/A	Traverse images - omitted
XVI	123:14:14	EVA 1	Outbound Drive to Station 1 - Part 2	Duke	109	Monochrome	17769	17774	ALSJ	N/A		N/A	Traverse images - omitted
XVI	123:25:08	EVA 1	Charlie's Station 1 Pan	Duke	109	Monochrome	17775	17793	ALSJ			N/A	
XVI	123:25:08	EVA 1	Charlie's Station 1 Pan North	Duke	109	Monochrome	17775	17786	ALSJ			N/A	Sub-panorama
XVI	123:25:08	EVA 1	Charlie's Station 1 Pan South	Duke	109	Monochrome	17787	17793	ALSJ			N/A	Sub-panorama
XVI	123:25:08	EVA 1	Charlie's Station 1 Pan - Alternative 1	Duke	109	Monochrome	17775	17779	ALSJ			N/A	Sub-panorama
XVI	123:25:08	EVA 1	Charlie's Station 1 Pan - Alternative 2	Duke	109	Monochrome	17787	17792	ALSJ			N/A	Sub-panorama
XVI	123:25:08	EVA 1	Charlie's Station 1 Pan - Alternative 3	Duke	109	Monochrome	17787	17792	ALSJ			N/A	Sub-panorama
XVI	124:02:22	EVA 1	John's Station 1 Pan	Young	114	Color	18415	18432	ALSJ			N/A	Alternate from LPI - JSC2012e052598
XVI	124:02:22	EVA 1	John's Station 1 Pan North	Young	114	Color	18415	18323	ALSJ			N/A	Sub-panorama
XVI	124:02:22	EVA 1	John's Station 1 Pan South	Young	114	Color	18425	18432	ALSJ			N/A	Sub-panorama
XVI	124:02:22	EVA 1	John's Station 1 Pan Mono	Young	114	Color	18418	18423	ALSJ			N/A	
XVI	124:02:22	EVA 1	John's Station 1 Pan - Two Charlies	Young	114	Color	18415	18432	ALSJ			N/A	
XVI	124:23:34	EVA 1	First Station 2 Pan	Duke	109	Monochrome	17811	17827	ALSJ			N/A	2nd Alternate from LPI - JSC2012e052599
XVI	124:23:34	EVA 1	First Station 2 Pan North	Duke	109	Monochrome	17811	17818	ALSJ			N/A	Sub-panorama
XVI	124:23:34	EVA 1	First Station 2 Pan South	Duke	109	Monochrome	17819	17827	ALSJ			N/A	Sub-panorama
XVI	124:23:34	EVA 1	First Station 2 Pan Alternative 1	Duke	109	Monochrome	17814	17825	ALSJ			N/A	Sub-panorama
XVI	124:23:34	EVA 1	First Station 2 Pan Alternative 2	Duke	109	Monochrome	17814	17816	ALSJ			N/A	Sub-panorama
XVI	124:23:34	EVA 1	First Station 2 Pan Alternative 3	Duke	109	Monochrome	17821	17825	ALSJ			N/A	Sub-panorama
XVI	124:23:34	EVA 1	Buster Crater Partial Pan	Duke	109	Monochrome	17828	17836	ALSJ			N/A	
XVI	124:28:40	EVA 1	500-mm Stone Mountain from Station 2	Duke	112	Monochrome	18193	18232	ALSJ			N/A	
XVI	124:28:40	EVA 1	500-mm South Ray from Station 2	Duke	112	Monochrome	18233	18239	ALSJ			N/A	
XVI	124:48:20	EVA 1	Return to the LM from Station 2	Duke	109	Monochrome	17849	07862	ALSJ	N/A		N/A	Traverse images - omitted
XVI	125:24:40	EVA 1	UV Camera, End of EVA-1	Young	114	Color	18439	18441	ALSJ			N/A	Note the stitching glitches in the second alternate image; the antenna on the LRV appears to be floating above the vehicle!

== EVA Panoramas - EVA 2 ==
Table 16.3 EVA 2 panoramas
Mission	Time (MET)	EVA #	Title	Astronaut	Magazine	Type	Start Frame	End Frame	Source	Reference Panorama	Sourced Alternate	Updated Panorama	Notes
XVI	143:13:46	EVA 2	4 O'Clock LM Pan, Start of EVA-2	Duke	107	Color	17420	17440	ALSJ			N/A	
XVI	143:13:46	EVA 2	4 O'Clock LM Pan, Start of EVA-2 North	Duke	107	Color	17420	17430	ALSJ			N/A	Sub-panorama
XVI	143:13:46	EVA 2	4 O'Clock LM Pan, Start of EVA-2 South	Duke	107	Color	17431	17440	ALSJ			N/A	Sub-panorama
XVI	143:31:21	EVA 2	EVA-2 Outbound Traverse, LM to Survey Ridge	Duke	110	Monochrome	17870	17888	ALSJ	N/A		N/A	Traverse - images omitted
XVI	143:42:15	EVA 2	EVA-2 Outbound Traverse, Survey Ridge	Duke	110	Monochrome	17889	17907	ALSJ	N/A		N/A	Traverse - images omitted
XVI	144:14:29	EVA 2	South Ray Crater as seen from Stone Mountain (Station 4)	Duke	112	Monochrome	18243	18252	LPI			N/A	JSC2007e045383
XVI	144:14:29	EVA 2	South Ray Crater and Baby Ray Crater from Station 4	Duke	112	Monochrome	18243	18259	ALSJ			N/A	
XVI	144:14:29	EVA 2	Central Portion of South Ray Crater from Station 4	Duke	112	Monochrome	18245	18248	ALSJ			N/A	Sub-panorama
XVI	144:14:29	EVA 2	Central Portion of South Ray Crater from Station 4 Alternative 1	Duke	112	Monochrome	18245	18252	ALSJ			N/A	Sub-panorama
XVI	144:14:29	EVA 2	Baby Ray Crater from Station 4	Duke	112	Monochrome	18253	18254	ALSJ			N/A	Sub-panorama
XVI	144:15:20	EVA 2	Stubby Crater from Station 4	Duke	112	Monochrome	18260	18268	ALSJ			N/A	
XVI	144:15:49	EVA 2	LM, Smoky Mountain, North Ray Crater, and Ravine Crater from Station 4	Duke	112	Monochrome	18269	18277	ALSJ			N/A	
XVI	144:48:00	EVA 2	John's Station 4 Pan	Young	107	Monochrome	17467	17489	ALSJ			N/A	
XVI	144:48:00	EVA 2	Station 4 Crater Detail, High Resolution	Young	107	Monochrome	17470	17473	ALSJ			N/A	Sub-panorama
XVI	144:48:00	EVA 2	John's Station 4 Pan, Northern Portion	Young	107	Monochrome	17470	11472	ALSJ			N/A	Sub-panorama
XVI	144:56:49	EVA 2	Charlie's Station 4 Pan	Duke	110	Monochrome	17952	17974	ALSJ			N/A	
XVI	144:56:49	EVA 2	Station 4 Rover	Duke	110	Monochrome	17960	17961	ALSJ			N/A	Sub-panorama
XVI	144:57:16	EVA 2	Station 4 Rover Tracks	Duke	110	Monochrome	17960	17968	ALSJ			N/A	Sub-panorama
XVI	143:32:15	EVA 2	EVA-2 inbound traverse, Station 4 to Station 5	Duke	110	Monochrome	17975	17990	ALSJ	N/A		N/A	Traverse - images omitted
XVI	145:10:20	EVA 2	Station 5 Pan	Duke	110	Monochrome	17991	18018	ALSJ			N/A	
XVI	145:58:36	EVA 2	Traverse Photos - Station 5 to Station 6	Duke	108	Monochrome	17585	17605	ALSJ	N/A		N/A	Traverse - images omitted
XVI	146:11:10	EVA 2	Charlie's Station 6 Pan	Duke	108	Monochrome	17606	17626	ALSJ			N/A	
XVI	146:11:10	EVA 2	Charlie's Station 6 Pan - John at the Rover	Duke	108	Monochrome	17619	17626	ALSJ			N/A	Sub-panorama
XVI	146:29:22	EVA 2	Traverse Photos - Station 6 to Station 8	Duke	108	Monochrome	17634	17662	ALSJ	N/A		N/A	Traverse - images omitted
XVI	146:43:51	EVA 2	Charlie's Station 8 pan	Duke	108	Monochrome	17663	17681	ALSJ			N/A	
XVI	146:43:51	EVA 2	Charlie's Station 8 pan - Antenna	Duke	108	Monochrome	17668	17671	ALSJ			N/A	Sub-panorama
XVI	146:29:22	EVA 2	Traverse Photos - Station 8 to Station 9	Duke	108	Monochrome	17703	17713	ALSJ	N/A		N/A	Traverse - images omitted
XVI	147:56:45	EVA 2	Charlie's Station 9 Pan	Duke	108	Monochrome	17714	17739	ALSJ			N/A	
XVI	147:56:45	EVA 2	Station 9 LRV Tracks	Duke	108	Monochrome	17733	17738	ALSJ			N/A	Sub-panorama
XVI	148:09:03	EVA 2	Station 9 Great Sneak	Duke	107	Monochrome	17560	17573	ALSJ	N/A		N/A	This is a collage, not a panorama (images excluded)
XVI	148:41:11	EVA 2	First "Rover Pan" - Stone Mountain	Duke	115	Monochrome	18507	18511	Original	N/A			Panorama created by cropping out foreground
XVI	149:20:40	EVA 2	John's ALSEP pan	Young	114	Monochrome	18449	18467	ALSJ			N/A	
XVI	149:20:40	EVA 2	John's ALSEP pan Rover	Young	114	Monochrome	18451	18463	ALSJ			N/A	Alternate from LPI - JSC2011e118362

== EVA Panoramas - EVA 3 ==
Somewhere between EVAs 2 and 3, the Reseau Plate on one of the cameras was smeared and all of the pictures on magazine 116 were impacted. Note the example shown below:-

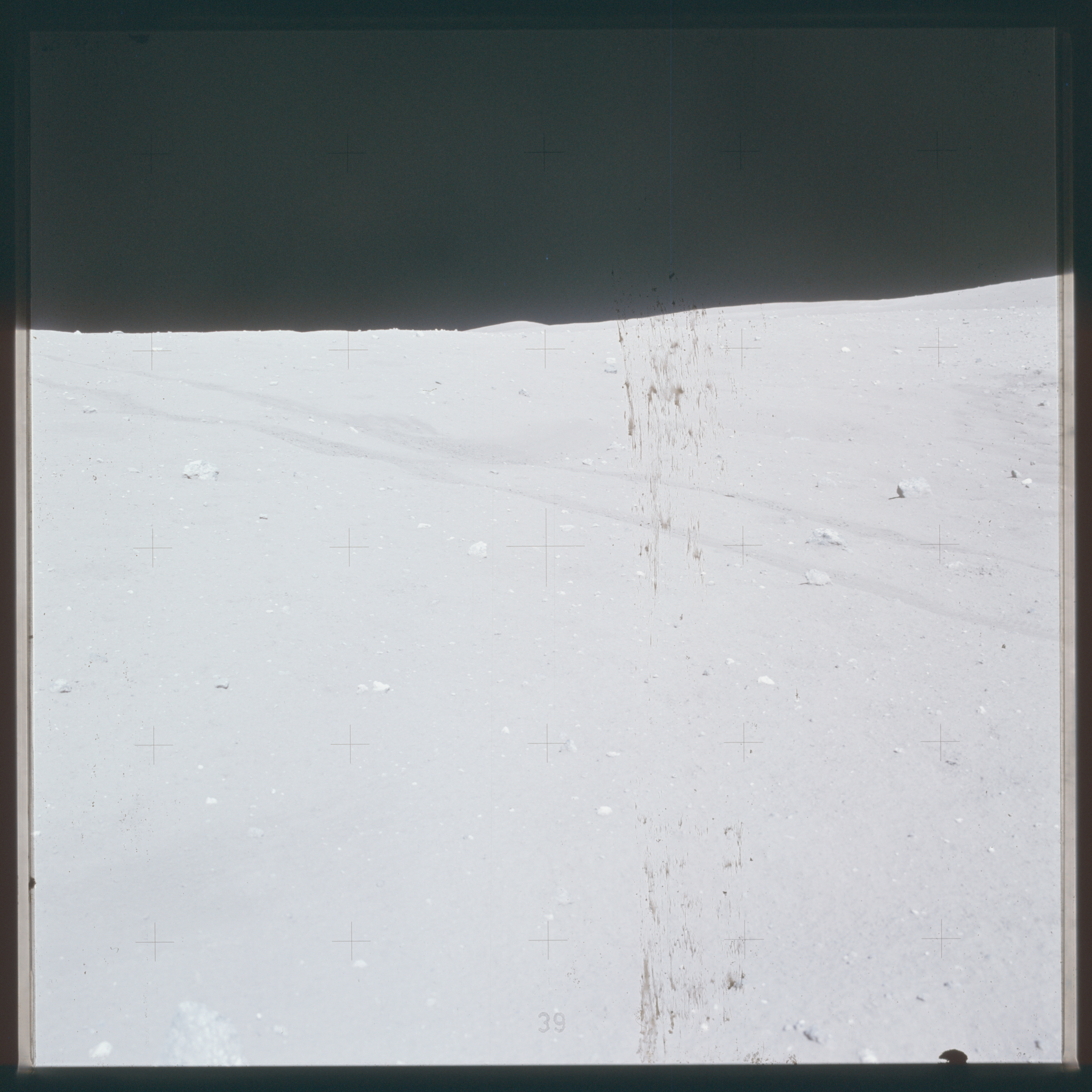
Example of smearing on all photos in Magazine 116.

Table 16.4 EVA 3 panoramas
Mission	Time (MET)	EVA #	Title	Astronaut	Magazine	Type	Start Frame	End Frame	Source	Reference Panorama	Sourced Alternate	Updated Panorama	Notes
XVI	165:50:58	EVA 3	Start of EVA-3, 500mm Stone Mountain Portrait	Young	105	Monochrome	17053	17116	ALSJ			N/A	
XVI	165:57:02	EVA 3	Charlie's Plus-Z Pan at the Start of EVA-3	Duke	116	Color	18563	18691	ALSJ			N/A	
XVI	165:57:02	EVA 3	Charlie's Plus-Z Pan at the Start of EVA-3 HR	Duke	116	Color	18574	18679	ALSJ			N/A	
XVI	165:57:02	EVA 3	Charlie's Plus-Z Pan at the Start of EVA-3 HR LPI	Duke	116	Color	18565	18591	LPI			N/A	JSC2007e045380
XVI	165:57:02	EVA 3	Apollo 16 Landing Site	Duke	116	Color	18573	18582	LPI			N/A	JSC2011e118363
XVI	166:53:20	EVA 3	North Ray Crater Interior, 500-mm Pan	Duke	105	Monochrome	17117	17181	ALSJ			N/A	
XVI	166:49:06	EVA 3	John's Station 11 Pan	Young	116	Color	18592	18614	ALSJ				
XVI	166:49:06	EVA 3	John's Station 11 Pan - Rover	Young	116	Color	18597	18607	ALSJ			N/A	Sub-Panorama
XVI	166:49:06	EVA 3	John's Station 11 Pan - Rover 2	Young	116	Color	18606	18609	ALSJ			N/A	Sub-Panorama
XVI	166:49:06	EVA 3	John's Station 11 Pan - LPI	Young	116	Monochrome	18594	18613	LPI			N/A	Sub-Panorama. JSC2007e045381
XVI	-	EVA 3	Rover TV panormama at Station 11	-	-	Color	-	-	Video at ALSJ			N/A	360 degrees
XVI	166:58:00	EVA 3	North Ray Crater, 1st Polarization Pan	Duke	106	Monochrome	17239	17248	ALSJ			N/A	
XVI	166:58:00	EVA 3	North Ray, 2nd Polarization Pan	Duke	106	Monochrome	17249	17262	ALSJ			N/A	
XVI	166:58:00	EVA 3	North Ray, 3rd Polarization Pan	Duke	106	Monochrome	17263	18276	ALSJ			N/A	
XVI	167:04:40	EVA 3	North Ray, 4th Polarization Pan	Duke	106	Monochrome	17277	17286	ALSJ			N/A	
XVI	167:04:40	EVA 3	North Ray, 5th Polarization Pan	Duke	106	Monochrome	17290	17303	ALSJ			N/A	
XVI	167:04:40	EVA 3	North Ray, 6th Polarization Pan	Duke	106	Monochrome	17304	17317	ALSJ			N/A	
XVI	167:43:21	EVA 3	Base of House Rock	Duke	106	Monochrome	17341	17344	ALSJ			N/A	
XVI	167:54:20	EVA 3	Base of House Rock 2	Duke	106	Monochrome	17349	17354	ALSJ			N/A	
XVI	168:09:26	EVA 3	Traverse Photos - Station 11 to Station 13	Duke	106	Monochrome	17357	1738	ALSJ	N/A		N/A	Traverse, images omitted
XVI	168:21:49	EVA 3	Station 13 Pan	Duke	106	Monochrome	17386	17404	ALSJ			N/A	
XVI	168:21:49	EVA 3	John and the Rover at Shadow Rock	Duke	106	Monochrome	17390	17393	ALSJ			N/A	First alternate sourced from LPI - JSC2007e045382
XVI	168:35:48	EVA 3	Portrait of Shadow Rock	Duke	106	Monochrome	17413	17417	ALSJ			N/A	
XVI	-	EVA 3	Rover TV panormama at Station 13	-	-	Color	-	-	Video at ALSJ			N/A	360 degrees
XVI	168:51:31	EVA 3	Second LRV Pan	Duke	117	Monochrome	18746	18750	Original	N/A			This Rover Pan is "accidental" in the sense that the composite images were taken whilst seated in the rover, but weren't part of a formalised procedure.
XVI	169:01:30	EVA 3	LRV Pan - Palmetto Crater	Duke	117	Monochrome	18765	187771	Original	N/A			Both of these updated images are identical in content, but differ in their brightness and contrast levels. The black areas are where the rover's TV camera has been masked out.
XVI	169:08:50	EVA 3	LRV Pan - Big Sag or Doodlebug Hole	Duke	117	Monochrome	18786	187788	Original	N/A			Both of these updated images are identical in content, but differ in their brightness and contrast levels. The black areas are where the rover's TV camera has been masked out. Location name(s) referenced in ALSJ at time reference 169:08:50.
XVI	169:19:42	EVA 3	Station 10-Prime Pan	Duke	117	Monochrome	18801	18823	ALSJ			N/A	

== Table Column Key ==
- Mission Flight Number
- Time (MET) Time since lift-off (MET - Mission Elapsed Time)
- EVA # Moonwalk number
- Title Title as extracted from source (i.e. ALSJ/LPI)
- Astronaut Who took the images
- Magazine NASA film canister number
- Type Either Color or Monochrome
- Start Frame First frame of the panoramic sequence
- End Frame Last frame of the panoramic sequence
- Source Where the panorama was sourced from (Typically ALSJ or LPI)
- Reference Panorama Image referred to by ALSJ/LPI for the given Title
- Sourced Alternate Alternate image(s) referred to by ALSJ/LPI for the given Title
- Updated Panorama Unofficial panorama generated by a non-NASA organisation/individual
- Notes Additional detail

== Post mission analysis ==
The primary purpose of taking the panoramic images was to provide the context, or placement, of the activities undertaken during the EVAs. The initial analysis was presented in the Apollo 16 Preliminary Science Report. The images continue to be revisited periodically with new, cleaner, representations of the panoramas after being processed by increasingly sophisticated software packages. Examples of these include LPI's Apollo Surface Panorama page, NASA's Johnson Space Center (JSC) 'Anniversary' Panoramas,, Mike Constantine's Apollo: The Panoramas, and Andy Saunders' Apollo Remastered.

== See also ==
- Apollo 11
- Apollo 12
- Apollo 14
- Apollo 15

== Footnotes ==
These tables catalogue the panoramic photos captured during the Apollo 16 mission. Entries in the 'Updated Panorama' column have been created using panorama blending software working on the High Resolution scans of the original frames held as the "Project Apollo Archive" on Flickr. Where a Reference Panorama is pre-existing, that has been used in preference to creating a new variant, unless there is additional value to be gained by regenerating it. Apart from some source image masking, all such new variants have been created using the minimum of processing, relying on the software package's inherent blending and optimisation capabilities - typically, such panoramas have been created within 3–5 minutes as they are intended to be 'representations' rather than 'definitive' examples. Consequently, brightness and contrast levels, as well as the removal of some frame-edges, have not been adjusted.

All 5-digit image references relate to the last 5 digits of the image names. The full image names follow the format AS16-MMM-NNNNN, where MMM relates to the Magazine number and NNNNN is the identifier.

EVA images include the overlaying of Réseau plate "crosses" to assist in their post-mission evaluation.

Almost all tabular data, such as time and image identifiers, has been extracted from the source location such as the ALSJ or LPI. The entries in the 'Title' column relate to the term used for the panorama as listed in the source's 'Assembled Panoramas' section.
