= Réseau =

The term réseau derives from a French word meaning "network". It may mean:

- Réseau plate, a network of fine lines on a glass plate
- a system of weather stations under a single agency, or cooperating on common goals
- an intelligence network as used by John Le Carré, in Tinker, Tailor, Soldier, Spy, chapter 11.
- the net in bobbin lace
- SNCF TGV Réseau
