= Lunar Panoramic Photography - Apollo 15 =

NASA's Apollo Lunar Surface Journal (ALSJ) records the details of each mission's period on the lunar surface as a timeline of the activities undertaken, the dialogue between the crew and Mission Control, and the relevant documentary records. Each photograph taken on the mission is catalogued there and each photographic sequence is also recorded. This page tabulates the Apollo 15 panoramas and, where appropriate, provides updated representations of the panoramas blended using more recent technologies than the originals.

== Context ==
Apollo 15 was the first of the Apollo program's "J" Missions which used an enhanced Lunar Module that was capable of supporting a 3-day stay on the lunar surface *and* the delivery of the Lunar Roving Vehicle (LRV or "Rover") to the surface to allow the crew to extend the range of their exploration and to provide remote TV coverage. The crew are recorded as having been particularly enthusiastic about the scientific aspects of the mission and had actively sought additional training by the ground-based scientists in the months leading up to launch. Although the landing site had not been covered by High Resolution photography from the preceding Lunar Orbiter program, the proximity of Hadley Rille, was sufficient for it to be selected. Consequently, the mission's commander, Dave Scott proposed and actioned an additional EVA not long after the landing. This "Stand-up EVA" (SEVA) simply consisted of opening the LM's docking hatch on the top of the vehicle (i.e. not the door used to climb down to the surface) to gain a high vantage point from which to survey the area and assist in the planning of the subsequent EVAs. (This was the only mission to feature an SEVA.)

In terms of photography, Apollo 15's crew proved to be as enthusiastic at that as they were about the science in general; they took a total of 1148 frames whilst on the Moon, a large number of which were components of almost 150 distinct panoramas. These range from seemingly mundane sequences of rock fields for post-mission analysis by teams of geologists, through to spectacular coverage of Hadley Rille and the surrounding mountains. Also, it is worth reminding the reader that, since Digital Photography was still several decades from becoming available, all of the images captured during the lunar missions were recorded on film and post-processed after their return to Earth.

To assist in gaining bearings, the Lunar Module (LM) Falcon, landed with its door and ladder leg (AKA "+Z strut") pointing approximately 20° north of due west. The Sun's elevation was around 13° for the SEVA, 19°-22° for EVA 1, 31°-35° for EVA 2, and 42°-44° for EVA 3.

The higher elevations of the Sun across the EVAs can be seen through the improvement in the quality of the panoramas; the Sun itself, and any resulting lens flair, are barely noticeable whereas they featured prominently in the proceeding missions.

== Non-EVA (LM-based) panoramas ==
As mentioned above, Apollo 15 was the only mission to feature a Stand-up EVA (SEVA).

Table 15.1 Non-EVA panoramas
Mission	Time (MET)	EVA #	Location	Astronaut	Magazine	Type	Start Frame	End Frame	Alternate Panorama	Source	Reference Panorama	ALSJ Alternate	Notes
XV	106:53:45	SEVA	Black & White SEVA Pan	Scott	85	Monochrome	11353	11382	N/A	ALSJ			This image featured in Appendix D of the Apollo 15 Preliminary Science Report.
XV	106:53:45	SEVA	Black & White SEVA Pan 1 HR North	Scott	85	Monochrome	11355	11362	N/A	ALSJ			
XV	106:53:45	SEVA	Black & White SEVA Pan 1 HR East	Scott	85	Monochrome	11363	11371	N/A	ALSJ			Note that the Sun features in the centre of this image. Since Falcon landed with its door (and hence windows) facing west (see above) this is the only non-EVA image in the entire Apollo program where the Sun appears (none of the other landings featured an SEVA).
XV	106:53:45	SEVA	Black & White SEVA Pan 1 HR South	Scott	85	Monochrome	11363	11371	N/A	ALSJ			
XV	106:56:54	SEVA	SEVA 500-mm Pan of Hill 305	Scott	84	Monochrome	11239	11241	N/A	ALSJ			
XV	106:56:54	SEVA	SEVA 500-mm Portrait of Pluton Crater	Scott	84	Monochrome	11242	11243	N/A	ALSJ			
XV	106:56:54	SEVA	SEVA 500-mm Portrait of Chain Crater	Scott	84	Monochrome	11244	11246	N/A	ALSJ			
XV	106:57:25	SEVA	SEVA 500-mm Pan of a northern portion of Hill 305	Scott	84	Monochrome	11247	11249	N/A	ALSJ			
XV	106:58:07	SEVA	SEVA 500-mm Pan of Silver Spur HR	Scott	84	Monochrome	11250	11253	N/A	ALSJ			
XV	106:58:27	SEVA	SEVA Color Pan	Scott	87	Color	11730	11758	N/A	ALSJ			This image featured in Appendix D of the Apollo 15 Preliminary Science Report.
XV	106:58:27	SEVA	SEVA Color Pan Hadley Silver	Scott	87	Color	11747	11751	N/A	ALSJ			
XV	106:58:27	SEVA	SEVA Color Pan HR North	Scott	87	Color	11732	11743	N/A	ALSJ			
XV	106:58:27	SEVA	SEVA Color Pan HR South	Scott	87	Color	11746	11730	N/A	ALSJ			
XV	107:31:57	Pre-EVA	Combined Post-SEVA Window Pan	Scott/Irwin	85	Monochrome	11383	11397	N/A	ALSJ			This image featured in Appendix D of the Apollo 15 Preliminary Science Report.
XV	107:31:57	Pre-EVA	Dave's Post-SEVA Window Pan	Scott	85	Monochrome	11383	11393	N/A	ALSJ			
XV	107:31:57	Pre-EVA	Jim's Post-SEVA Window Pan	Irwin	85	Monochrome	11394	11397	N/A	ALSJ			
XIV	169:37:47	Post-EVA-3	Post-EVA-3 CDR Window Pan	Scott	88	Color	11931	11946		ALSJ	N/A - Broken link at ALSJ		Alternate generated due to missing original
XIV	169:37:47	Post-EVA-3	Post-EVA-3 LMP Window Pan	Irwin	88	Color	11947	11956	N/A	ALSJ			
XIV	169:37:47	Post-EVA-3	Post-EVA-3 Composite Window Pan	Scott/Irwin	88	Color	11931	11956	N/A	ALSJ			This image featured in Appendix D of the Apollo 15 Preliminary Science Report.
XIV	169:37:47	Post-EVA-3	First Post-EVA-3 500-mm Pan of the North Complex	Irwin	88	Color	11204	11217	N/A	ALSJ			
XIV	169:37:47	Post-EVA-3	Second Post-EVA-3 500-mm Pan of the North Complex	Irwin	90	Monochrome	12249	12256	N/A	ALSJ			
XIV	169:37:47	Post-EVA-3	Post-EVA-3 500-mm	Scott	90	Monochrome	12257	12258	N/A	ALSJ			
XIV	169:37:47	Post-EVA-3	Post-EVA-3 500-mm Hill 305	Scott	90	Monochrome	12259	12261	N/A	ALSJ			
XIV	169:37:47	Post-EVA-3	Post-EVA-3 500-mm Mt Hadley Delta	Scott	90	Monochrome	12262	12265	N/A	ALSJ			

== EVA panoramas - EVA 1 ==
The crew's priority on the first EVA was the deployment of the Lunar Roving Vehicle (LRV) which would enable them to drive rather than walk to remote locations. An added bonus was that the LRV was equipped with a TV camera that could be controlled remotely from Mission Control (unlike the tripod camera they also had); the quicker they got it set up, the quicker pictures would reach the science teams and the public at large. Consequently, they skipped the by-now "traditional" taking of "Tourist Shots" such as descending the ladder and saluting the flag at the beginning of the mission and pushed on to start exploring further afield. It took about 3 hours from exiting the LM to arriving at the first geology 'station' and the first panoramic shots.

Table 15.2 EVA 1 panoramas
Mission	Time (MET)	EVA #	Location	Astronaut	Magazine	Type	Start Frame	End Frame	Alternate Panorama	Source	Reference Panorama	ALSJ Alternate	Notes
XV	122:14:35	EVA 1	Station 1 Pan	Scott	85	Monochrome	11398	11415	N/A	ALSJ			This image featured in Appendix D of the Apollo 15 Preliminary Science Report.
XV	122:14:35	EVA 1	Station 1 Pan - Stereo	Scott	85	Monochrome	11398	11407	N/A	ALSJ			
XV	122:14:35	EVA 1	Station 1 Pan - Two-frame down-Sun	Scott	85	Monochrome	11398	11399	N/A	ALSJ			
XV	122:14:35	EVA 1	Station 1 Pan - Four frame North	Scott	85	Monochrome	11400	11404	N/A	ALSJ			
XV	122:38:47	EVA 1	First Station 2 Pan	Irwin	85	Monochrome	11422	11438	N/A	ALSJ			This image featured in Appendix D of the Apollo 15 Preliminary Science Report.
XV	122:38:47	EVA 1	First Station 2 Pan - Up-Rille	Irwin	85	Monochrome	11422	11427	N/A	ALSJ	F		Sub-panorama
XV	122:38:47	EVA 1	First Station 2 Pan - Glass Boulder	Irwin	85	Monochrome	11435	11438	N/A	ALSJ			Sub-panorama
XV	123:17:15	EVA 1	Second Station 2 Pan	Irwin	85	Monochrome	11446	11465	N/A	ALSJ			This image featured in Appendix D of the Apollo 15 Preliminary Science Report.
XV	123:17:15	EVA 1	Second Station 2 Pan - Alternate	Irwin	85	Monochrome	11448	11454	N/A	LPI			Sub-panorama
XV	123:17:15	EVA 1	Second Station 2 Pan - Up-rille	Irwin	85	Monochrome	11449	11451	N/A	ALSJ			Sub-panorama
XV	123:17:15	EVA 1	Second Station 2 Pan - Hadley Swann	Irwin	85	Monochrome	11449	11455	N/A	ALSJ			Sub-panorama
XV	123:19:35	EVA 1	Station 2 500-mm Pan of Trophy Point, First Strip	Scott	84	Monochrome	11254	11268	N/A	ALSJ			
XV	123:20:51	EVA 1	Station 2 500-mm Pan of Trophy Point, Second Strip	Scott	84	Monochrome	11269	11275	N/A	ALSJ			
XV	123:20:51	EVA 1	Station 2 500-mm Pan of Trophy Point, Vertical Strip	Scott	84	Monochrome	11276	11283	N/A	ALSJ			
XV	123:20:51	EVA 1	Station 2 500-mm Pan of Trophy Point, Combined	Scott	84	Monochrome	11254	11283	N/A	ALSJ			
XV	123:21:30	EVA 1	Station 2 500-mm Shots of the Rille Bottom	Scott	84	Monochrome	11284	11288	N/A	ALSJ			
XV	123:21:30	EVA 1	Station 2 500-mm Shots of the Rille Bottom - 1st seq	Scott	84	Monochrome	11284	11286	N/A	ALSJ			
XV	123:21:30	EVA 1	Station 2 500-mm Shots of the Rille Bottom - 2nd seq	Scott	84	Monochrome	11287	11288	N/A	ALSJ			
XV	123:45:01	EVA 1	Seatbelt Basalt Pan	Scott	86	Color	11583	11587	N/A	ALSJ			This image featured in Appendix D of the Apollo 15 Preliminary Science Report.
XV	123:45:12	EVA 1	EVA-1 Closeout	Scott	86	Color	11600	11602		ALSJ			Note color film magazine, monochrome representation at ALSJ.

== EVA panoramas - EVA 2 ==
It was during the second EVA that Scott discovered what became known as the "Genesis Rock". This anorthosite is believed to be a sample of the Moon's early crust, and the hope of finding something like it had been a major objective during the selection of the site for the mission. Although the ALSJ records the finding of this as a "Panorama", the recorded image is simply a collage of five disjoint images.

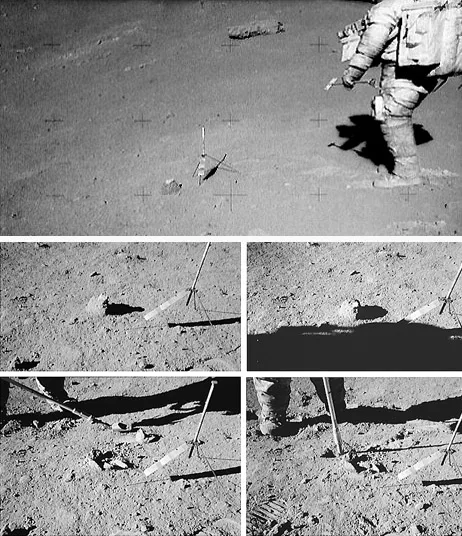
ALSJ Genesis Rock "Panorama"

Table 15.3 EVA 2 panoramas
Mission	Time (MET)	EVA #	Location	Astronaut	Magazine	Type	Start Frame	End Frame	Alternate Panorama	Source	Reference Panorama	ALSJ Alternate	Notes
XV	143:38:21	EVA 2	Rover Pan	Scott	85	Monochrome	11472	11480	N/A	ALSJ			This image featured in Appendix D of the Apollo 15 Preliminary Science Report.
XV	143:55:26	EVA 2	Station 6 Jim's First Pan	Irwin	85	Monochrome	11481	11497	N/A	ALSJ			This image featured in Appendix D of the Apollo 15 Preliminary Science Report.
XV	144:14:17	EVA 2	Station 6 Jim's Second Pan	Irwin	85	Monochrome	11507	11522	N/A	ALSJ			This image featured in Appendix D of the Apollo 15 Preliminary Science Report.
XV	144:14:17	EVA 2	Station 6 Jim's Second Pan - Portion	Irwin	85	Monochrome	11509	11516	N/A	ALSJ			Sub-panorama
XV	144:24:17	EVA 2	Station 6 Crater Sample Mosaic	Scott	86	Monochrome	11636	11640	N/A	ALSJ	N/A		This is a collage rather than a panorama. Omitted.
XV	144:46:38	EVA 2	Station 6 500-mm Mt. Hadley Summit, First Series	Scott	84	Monochrome	11292	11301		ALSJ			
XV	144:47:51	EVA 2	Station 6 500-mm Mt. Hadley Summit, Second Series	Scott	84	Monochrome	11302	11308	N/A	ALSJ			
XV	144:47:51	EVA 2	Station 6 500-mm Vertical Sequence of Mt. Hadley	Scott	84	Monochrome	11309	11315	N/A	ALSJ			
XV	144:50:48	EVA 2	Station 6 500-mm Leading Edge of Swann Mountain	Scott	84	Monochrome	11316	11317	N/A	ALSJ			
XV	144:50:48	EVA 2	Station 6 500-mm Left Flank of Mt. Hadley	Scott	84	Monochrome	11318	11322	N/A	ALSJ			
XV	144:50:48	EVA 2	Station 6 500-mm Mt. Hadley Composite	Scott	84	Monochrome	11292	11322	N/A	ALSJ			
XV	144:50:48	EVA 2	Station 6 500-mm LM and Pluton Crater	Scott	84	Monochrome	11324	11325	N/A	ALSJ			
XV	144:50:48	EVA 2	Station 6 500-mm Lineations	Scott	84	Monochrome	11326	11327	N/A	ALSJ			
XV	144:50:48	EVA 2	Station 6 500-mm Lower Portions of the Left Flank of Mt. Hadley	Scott	84	Monochrome	11328	11330	N/A	ALSJ			
XV	144:50:48	EVA 2	Station 6 500-mm Hill 305	Scott	84	Monochrome	11331	11332	N/A	ALSJ			
XV	144:50:48	EVA 2	Station 6 500-mm Hadley Rille	Scott	84	Monochrome	11333	11335	N/A	ALSJ			
XV	144:50:48	EVA 2	Station 6 500-mm Hadley Delta Summit Outcrops	Scott	84	Monochrome	11336	11346	N/A	ALSJ			
XV	144:50:48	EVA 2	Station 6 500-mm View to the East	Scott	84	Monochrome	11347	11349	N/A	ALSJ			
XV	145:07:26	EVA 2	Station 6a Pan	Irwin	90	Monochrome	12179	12193	N/A	ALSJ			This image featured in Appendix D of the Apollo 15 Preliminary Science Report.
XV	145:07:26	EVA 2	Station 6a Pan - Boulder	Irwin	90	Monochrome	12179	12193	N/A	ALSJ			
XV	145:07:26	EVA 2	Station 6a Pan - West	Irwin	90	Monochrome	12179	12193	N/A	ALSJ	N/A		Image missing at ALSJ
XV	145:07:26	EVA 2	Station 6a Pan - East	Irwin	90	Monochrome	12188	12193	N/A	ALSJ			Sub-panorama
XV	145:28:12	EVA 2	Station 7 Pan	Irwin	90	Monochrome	12201	12222	N/A	ALSJ			This image featured in Appendix D of the Apollo 15 Preliminary Science Report.
XV	145:28:12	EVA 2	Station 7 Pan - Eastern Horizon	Irwin	90	Monochrome	12208	12212	N/A	ALSJ			Sub-panorama. Markers can be referenced on this map -: 1. Markers
XV	145:28:12	EVA 2	Station 7 Pan - Inbound Rover Tracks from Station 6a	Irwin	90	Monochrome	12212	12214	N/A	ALSJ			Sub-panorama
XV	145:28:12	EVA 2	Station 7 Pan - Rover and Spur Crater	Irwin	90	Monochrome	12217	12222	N/A	ALSJ			Sub-panorama
XV	145:34:52	EVA 2	Station 7 White Vein Rock	Irwin	90	Monochrome	12224	?	N/A	ALSJ	N/A		This is a collage rather than a panorama. Omitted.
XV	145:42:07	EVA 2	Genesis Rock	Irwin	90	Monochrome	12228	?	N/A	ALSJ	N/A		This is a collage rather than a panorama. Omitted.
XV	145:55:13	EVA 2	Station 7 Breccia Boulder	Scott	86	Monochrome	11628	?	N/A	ALSJ	N/A		This is a collage rather than a panorama. Omitted.
XV	146:30:33	EVA 2	Station 4 Pan	Irwin	90	Monochrome	12237	12248	N/A	ALSJ			This is an unusual entry because ALSJ leads with a sub-panorama and yet the alternate is the complete sequence. This image featured in Appendix D of the Apollo 15 Preliminary Science Report.
XV	146:30:33	EVA 2	Dune Crater 1 - A15 S71-47077	Irwin	90	Monochrome	12237	12232	N/A	ALSJ/USGS			Sub-panorama
XV	146:30:33	EVA 2	Dune Crater 2 - A15 S71-47080	Irwin	90	Monochrome	12232	12248	N/A	ALSJ/USGS			Sub-panorama
XV	147:27:12	EVA 2	12 O'Clock LM Pan at the end of EVA-2	Irwin	87	Color	11785	11804	N/A	ALSJ			This image featured in Appendix D of the Apollo 15 Preliminary Science Report.
XV	147:27:12	EVA 2	4 O'Clock LM Pan at the end of EVA-2	Irwin	87	Color	11805	11821	N/A	ALSJ		JSC Alternate	This image featured in Appendix D of the Apollo 15 Preliminary Science Report.
XV	147:27:12	EVA 2	B&W of LM from the Northeast	Irwin	87	Monochrome	11816	11820	N/A	ALSJ			Sub-panorama
XV	147:27:12	EVA 2	8 O'Clock LM Pan at the end of EVA-2	Irwin	87	Color	11822	11840	N/A	ALSJ			Reverse order. This image featured in Appendix D of the Apollo 15 Preliminary Science Report.
XV	147:27:12	EVA 2	LM from the southeast	Irwin	87	Monochrome	11835	11840	N/A	ALSJ			Sub-panorama. Reverse Order (11840->11835)
XV	147:38:40	EVA 2	Jim's ALSEP Pan at the end of EVA-2	Irwin	87	Color	11843	11858	N/A	ALSJ			This image featured in Appendix D of the Apollo 15 Preliminary Science Report.
XV	147:38:40	EVA 2	Jim's ALSEP Pan at the end of EVA-2 - mini-pan	Irwin	87	Color	11845	11847	N/A	ALSJ			Sub-panorama
XV	147:38:40	EVA 2	Drilling activities	Irwin	87	Monochrome	11845	11849	N/A	ALSJ			Sub-panorama
XV	148:02:20	EVA 2	Dave's Station 8 Pan	Scott	92	Monochrome	12420	12438	N/A	ALSJ			Sub-panorama. This image featured in Appendix D of the Apollo 15 Preliminary Science Report.
XV	148:02:20	EVA 2	Apollo 15 Station 8	Scott	92	Monochrome	12420	12438	N/A	LPI			Sub-panorama. Note, this differs to the preceding image; the crop has been shifted upwards and the Réseau plate crosses have been retained.
XV	148:02:20	EVA 2	Station 8 Trench	Scott	92	Monochrome	12424	12426	N/A	ALSJ	N/A		This is a collage rather than a panorama. Omitted.

== EVA panoramas - EVA 3 ==
[So many panoramas were taken during the EVAs that they are better tabulated for each individual EVA]

A large proportion of the EVA 3 panoramas were intended for subsequent geological analysis.

Table 15.4 EVA 3 panoramas
Mission	Time (MET)	EVA #	Location	Astronaut	Magazine	Type	Start Frame	End Frame	Alternate Panorama	Source	Reference Panorama	ALSJ Alternate	Notes
XV	164:23:13	EVA 3	EVA-3 ALSEP Pan No. 1	Irwin	88	Color	11878	11881	N/A	ALSJ			
XV	164:26:56	EVA 3	EVA-3 ALSEP Pan No. 2	Irwin	82	Monochrome	11047	11064	N/A	ALSJ			This image featured in Appendix D of the Apollo 15 Preliminary Science Report.
XV	164:26:56	EVA 3	EVA-3 ALSEP Pan No. 2	Irwin	82	Monochrome	11054	11058	N/A	LPI			Sub-Panorama
XV	164:26:56	EVA 3	EVA-3 ALSEP Pan No. 2 - LM	Irwin	82	Monochrome	11055	11057		ALSJ			Sub-Panorama
XV	164:26:56	EVA 3	EVA-3 ALSEP Pan No. 2 - Rover	Irwin	82	Monochrome	11059	11062	N/A	ALSJ			Sub-Panorama
XV	164:26:56	EVA 3	EVA-3 ALSEP Pan No. 2 - Hadley and LM	Irwin	82	Monochrome	11050	11057	N/A	ALSJ			Sub-Panorama
XV	165:05:09	EVA 3	Station 9 Pan	Scott	82	Monochrome	11066	11092	N/A	ALSJ			This image featured in Appendix D of the Apollo 15 Preliminary Science Report.
XV	165:21:16	EVA 3	Station 9a Pan	Irwin	82	Monochrome	11110	11127	N/A	ALSJ			
XV	165:21:16	EVA 3	Station 9a Pan	Irwin	82	Monochrome	11110	11127	N/A	LPI			This image featured in Appendix D of the Apollo 15 Preliminary Science Report.
XV	165:21:16	EVA 3	Station 9a Pan North	Irwin	82	Monochrome	11110	11116	N/A	ALSJ			Sub-Panorama
XV	165:21:16	EVA 3	Station 9a Pan - Dave at Rover	Irwin	82	Monochrome	11120	11126	N/A	ALSJ			Sub-Panorama
XV	165:21:16	EVA 3	Station 9a Pan - Dave at work	Irwin	82	Monochrome	11121	11122	N/A	ALSJ			Sub-Panorama
XV	165:26:44	EVA 3	Station 9a 500-mm Horizontal Strip along West Wall Outcrops	Scott	89	Monochrome	12015	12027	N/A	ALSJ			
XV	165:27:24	EVA 3	Station 9a 500-mm Talus Slope below West Wall Outcrops	Scott	89	Monochrome	12028	12044	N/A	ALSJ			
XV	165:27:24	EVA 3	Station 9a 500-mm West Wall Outcrops, Combined	Scott	89	Monochrome	12028	12044	N/A	ALSJ			
XV	165:28:46	EVA 3	Station 9a 500-mm West Wall Outcrops, First Vertical Strip	Scott	89	Monochrome	12045	12048	N/A	ALSJ			
XV	165:28:46	EVA 3	Station 9a 500-mm West Wall Outcrops, Second Vertical Strip	Scott	89	Monochrome	12049	12052	N/A	ALSJ			
XV	165:28:46	EVA 3	Station 9a 500-mm West Wall Outcrops, Third Vertical Strip	Scott	89	Monochrome	12053	12056	N/A	ALSJ			
XV	165:29:16	EVA 3	Station 9a 500-mm West Wall Crater	Scott	89	Monochrome	12057	12062	N/A	ALSJ			
XV	165:29:51	EVA 3	Station 9a 500-mm Mare Surface west of Hadley Rille	Scott	89	Monochrome	12063	12068	N/A	ALSJ			
XV	165:29:51	EVA 3	Station 9a 500-mm Vertical Sequence of Debris-Filled Crater	Scott	89	Monochrome	12069	12073	N/A	ALSJ			
XV	165:31:38	EVA 3	Station 9a 500-mm, West Wall Boulders	Scott	89	Monochrome	12075	12078	N/A	ALSJ			
XV	165:31:38	EVA 3	Station 9a 500-mm, Debris-Filled Crater to Trophy Point - Extended	Scott	89	Monochrome	12047	12086	N/A	ALSJ			(Best description is at ALSJ timeline https://www.nasa.gov/history/alsj/a15/a15.rille.html#1653138 )
XV	165:35:02	EVA 3	Station 9a 500-mm, Debris-Filled Crater and Slope Below	Scott	89	Monochrome	12083	12086	N/A	ALSJ			Sub-panorama
XV	165:35:02	EVA 3	Station 9a East Wall of Hadley Rille	Scott	89	Monochrome	12087	12094	N/A	ALSJ			
XV	166:18:56	EVA 3	Station 10 Jim's Pan	Irwin	82	Monochrome	11165	11184	N/A	ALSJ			This image featured in Appendix D of the Apollo 15 Preliminary Science Report.
XV	166:18:56	EVA 3	View of the Rille South thru West to North	Irwin	82	Monochrome	11165	11184	N/A	ALSJ			
XV	166:18:56	EVA 3	View to the South Along the Rille	Irwin	82	Monochrome	11174	11180	N/A	ALSJ			Sub-panorama
XV	166:18:56	EVA 3	Dave Rover	Irwin	82	Monochrome	11165	11169	N/A	ALSJ			Sub-panorama
XV	166:18:56	EVA 3	West view	Irwin	82	Monochrome	11180	11182	N/A	ALSJ			Sub-panorama
XV	166:18:56	EVA 3	South view	Irwin	82	Monochrome	11180	11182	N/A	ALSJ			Sub-panorama
XV	166:18:56	EVA 3	High-resolution portrait of Dave carrying the 500-mm	Irwin	82	Monochrome	11167	11168	N/A	ALSJ			Sub-panorama
XV	166:20:51	EVA 3	Dave Station 10 500-mm Top of the West Wall Outcrops	Scott	89	Monochrome	12097	12116	N/A	ALSJ			
XV	166:20:51	EVA 3	Dave Station 10 500-mm West Wall Continuation	Scott	89	Monochrome	12117	12121	N/A	ALSJ			
XV	166:20:51	EVA 3	Station 10 500-mm Sequence of the West Wall Crater	Scott	89	Monochrome	12122	12126	N/A	ALSJ			
XV	166:20:51	EVA 3	Station 10 500-mm Sequence of the Mare Surface beyond the West Wall Crater	Scott	89	Monochrome	12127	12131	N/A	ALSJ			
XV	166:20:51	EVA 3	Station 10 500-mm Sequence below the West Wall Crater	Scott	89	Monochrome	12132	12136	N/A	ALSJ			
XV	166:20:51	EVA 3	Station 10 500-mm West Wall Crater, Composite of Horizontal Strips	Scott	89	Monochrome	12122	12136	N/A	ALSJ			
XV	166:20:51	EVA 3	Station 10 500-mm Vertical Strip Through the West Wall Crater	Scott	89	Monochrome	12137	12142	N/A	ALSJ			
XV	166:20:51	EVA 3	Station 10 500-mm Top of the Talus Slope	Scott	89	Monochrome	12143	12144	N/A	ALSJ			
XV	166:20:51	EVA 3	Station 10 500-mm Trophy Point	Scott	89	Monochrome	12145	12148	N/A	ALSJ			
XV	166:20:51	EVA 3	Station 10 500-mm West Wall Crater Composite	Scott	89	Monochrome	12122	12148	N/A	ALSJ			
XV	166:20:51	EVA 3	Station 10 500-mm Vertical Sequence of West Wall	Scott	89	Monochrome	12152	12156	N/A	ALSJ			
XV	166:20:51	EVA 3	Station 10 500-mm Additional Vertical Sequence of West Wall	Scott	89	Monochrome	12157	12159	N/A	ALSJ			
XV	166:20:51	EVA 3	Station 10 500-mm West Wall Outcrops Composite	Scott	89	Monochrome	12097	12159	N/A	ALSJ			
XV	166:20:51	EVA 3	Station 10 500-mm Slope into Hadley Rille from the East Rim	Scott	89	Monochrome	12160	12162	N/A	ALSJ			
XV	166:41:17	EVA 3	EVA-3 Return to LM	Irwin	82	Monochrome	11192	11194	N/A	ALSJ			
XV	167:10:16	EVA 3	EVA-3 Closeout, 500mm, Big Rock Mountain and foreground hill in the Swann Range	Scott	89	Monochrome	12165	12171	N/A	ALSJ			
XV	167:10:16	EVA 3	EVA-3 Closeout, 500-mm, Mt Hadley Delta Summit	Scott	89	Monochrome	12173	12174	N/A	ALSJ			
XV	167:10:16	EVA 3	EVA-3 Closeout, 500-mm, Left flank of 'leading edge' hill	Scott	89	Monochrome	12172	12177	N/A	ALSJ			
XV	167:48:59	EVA 3	VIP Site Pan	Scott	88	Color	11895	11925		ALSJ			This image featured in Appendix D of the Apollo 15 Preliminary Science Report.
XV	167:48:59	EVA 3	Rover 'RIP' Pan 1	Scott	88	Color	11895	11903	N/A	JSC			https://www.flickr.com/photos/nasa2explore/9356383693/in/photolist-ffMUUe-ffMURn-ffMUWB/
XV	167:48:59	EVA 3	Rover 'RIP' Pan 2	Scott	88	Color	11904	11915	N/A	JSC			https://www.flickr.com/photos/nasa2explore/9356383527/in/photolist-ffMUUe-ffMURn-ffMUWB/
XV	167:48:59	EVA 3	Rover 'RIP' Pan 3	Scott	88	Color	11916	11925	N/A	JSC			https://www.flickr.com/photos/nasa2explore/9356383831/in/photolist-ffMUUe-ffMURn-ffMUWB/

== Key to table columns ==
- Mission Flight Number
- Time (MET) Time since lift-off (MET - Mission Elapsed Time)
- EVA # Moonwalk number
- Location Title as extracted from source (i.e. ALSJ/LPI)
- Astronaut Who took the images
- Magazine NASA film canister number
- Type Either Color or Monochrome
- Start Frame First frame of the panoramic sequence
- End Frame Last frame of the panoramic sequence
- Alternate Panorama Unofficial panorama generated by a non-NASA organisation
- Source Where the panorama was sourced from (Typically ALSJ or LPI)
- Reference Panorama Image referred to by ALSJ/LPI for the given location
- ALSJ Alternate Alternate image(s) referred to by ALSJ/LPI for the given location
- Notes Additional detail

== Post mission analysis ==
The primary purpose of taking the panoramic images was to provide the context, or placement, of the activities undertaken during the EVAs. The initial analysis was presented in the Apollo 15 Preliminary Science Report. The images continue to be revisited periodically with new, cleaner, representations of the panoramas after being processed by increasingly sophisticated software packages. Examples of these include LPI's Apollo Surface Panorama page, NASA's Johnson Space Center (JSC) 'Anniversary' Panoramas,, Mike Constantine's Apollo: The Panoramas, and Andy Saunders' Apollo Remastered.

== See also ==
- Lunar Panoramic Photography - Apollo 11
- Lunar Panoramic Photography - Apollo 12
- Lunar Panoramic Photography - Apollo 14
- Lunar Panoramic Photography - Apollo 16

== Footnotes ==
These tables catalogue the panoramic photos captured during the Apollo 15 mission. Entries in the 'Alternate Panorama' column have created using panorama blending software using the High Resolution scans of the original frames held as the "Project Apollo Archive" on Flickr. Where a Reference Panorama is pre-existing, that has been used in preference to creating a new variant, unless there is additional value to be gained by regenerating it. Apart from some source image masking, all such new variants have been created using the minimum of processing, relying on the software package's inherent blending and optimisation capabilities - typically, such panoramas have been created within 3–5 minutes as they are intended to be 'representations' rather than 'definitive' examples. Consequently, brightness and contrast levels, as well as some frame-edges, have not been adjusted.

All 5-digit image references relate to the last 5 digits of the image names. The full image names follow the format AS15-MM-NNNNN, where MM relates to the Magazine number and NNNNN is the identifier.

EVA images include the overlaying of Réseau plate "crosses" to assist in their post-mission evaluation.

All tabular data, such as time and image identifiers, has been extracted from the ALSJ. The entries in the 'Location' column relate to the term used for the panorama as listed in the ALSJ's 'Assembled Panoramas' section.
