= Lunar Panoramic Photography - Apollo 11 =

Panoramic photos taken during the Apollo 11 lunar mission

NASA's Apollo Lunar Surface Journal (ALSJ) records the details of each mission's period on the lunar surface as a timeline of the activities undertaken, the dialogue between the crew and Mission Control, and the relevant documentary records. It catalogues each photograph taken and each multi-frame, panoramic, sequence is also recorded. The panoramas would be in the form of a number of overlapping frames that would be airbrushed together as a mosaic once the film had been processed back on Earth. By recording the site in this way, all other aspects of the mission to the surface could be placed in context. This page tabulates the Apollo 11 panoramas and, where appropriate, provides updated representations that have been blended using more recent, digital, technologies than the originals used.

Although the taking of panoramic photos on the surface featured highly in the plans of all the landings, the process by which the astronauts were trained to take them is not well recorded (Phinney is probably the best source). Although some members of the astronaut corps were acknowledged as being "camera buffs", the majority had little or no experience of the principles of photography, and all required training in the use of the chosen camera, the Hasselblad 500 EL, then considered as one of the best cameras available. As good as the cameras were, the astronauts had to overcome using them without a viewfinder, manually changing the aperture and exposure settings to make allowance for the low Sun angles for every shot, all while wearing a spacesuit.

== Overview ==
Despite its historic nature, the primary purpose of Apollo 11 was simple: to perform a manned lunar landing and return. All other aspects were considered as bonuses, including the Extravehicular Activity/EVA on the surface (AKA Moonwalk) which was kept to the barest minimum of placing a few experimental devices, grabbing a few rocks, and taking a few photographs. The Apollo 11 Lunar Surface Operations Plan not only includes the taking of at least 4 panoramas within the 'Nominal Timeline', but includes basic instructions on how this should be achieved - "Take 12 photo panorama from position 20 feet in front of the +Z pad.". In all, Neil Armstrong and Buzz Aldrin took 122 photographs whilst walking on the lunar surface, a fair proportion of which would be used in those panoramas. They also took pictures of the surface from within the cabin of the Lunar Module both before and after the EVA and, again, many of these were intended for the inclusion in panoramas. Some of the image sequences were considered as "Contingency" shots, taken quickly as a priority in case a hasty departure from the surface was required.

== Pre-EVA panoramas ==
The immediate priority for the astronauts after landing was the preparation of the Lunar Module to allow it to promptly depart the Moon should an emergency situation arise. These activities meant that it was almost an hour and a quarter before they reached the point on page 5 of the LM Lunar Surface Checklist that called for the crew to "Stow window shades and photograph surface". First Armstrong, and then Aldrin, took contingency shots through each of their windows and, although Aldrin's sequence (5454–5458) aligns as a panorama, Armstrong's is discontiguous with a gap in the centre-right of his window view (5449–5453).

=== Dealing with omissions in panoramic sequences ===
To make up for the omission in Armstrong's sequence, the Apollo Lunar Surface Journal (ALSJ) includes an assembled panorama where post-EVA images have been used to fill-in the gap. Although the resulting panorama does not include any of the footmarks left by the EVA, the difference in the times of the component shots is highlighted by a change in the illumination of the surface caused by the change in Sun's elevation, and this is manifested as a change in the surface color between the frames. Where this technique is used in the subsequent shots it is recorded in the "Notes" column as a "Composite image".

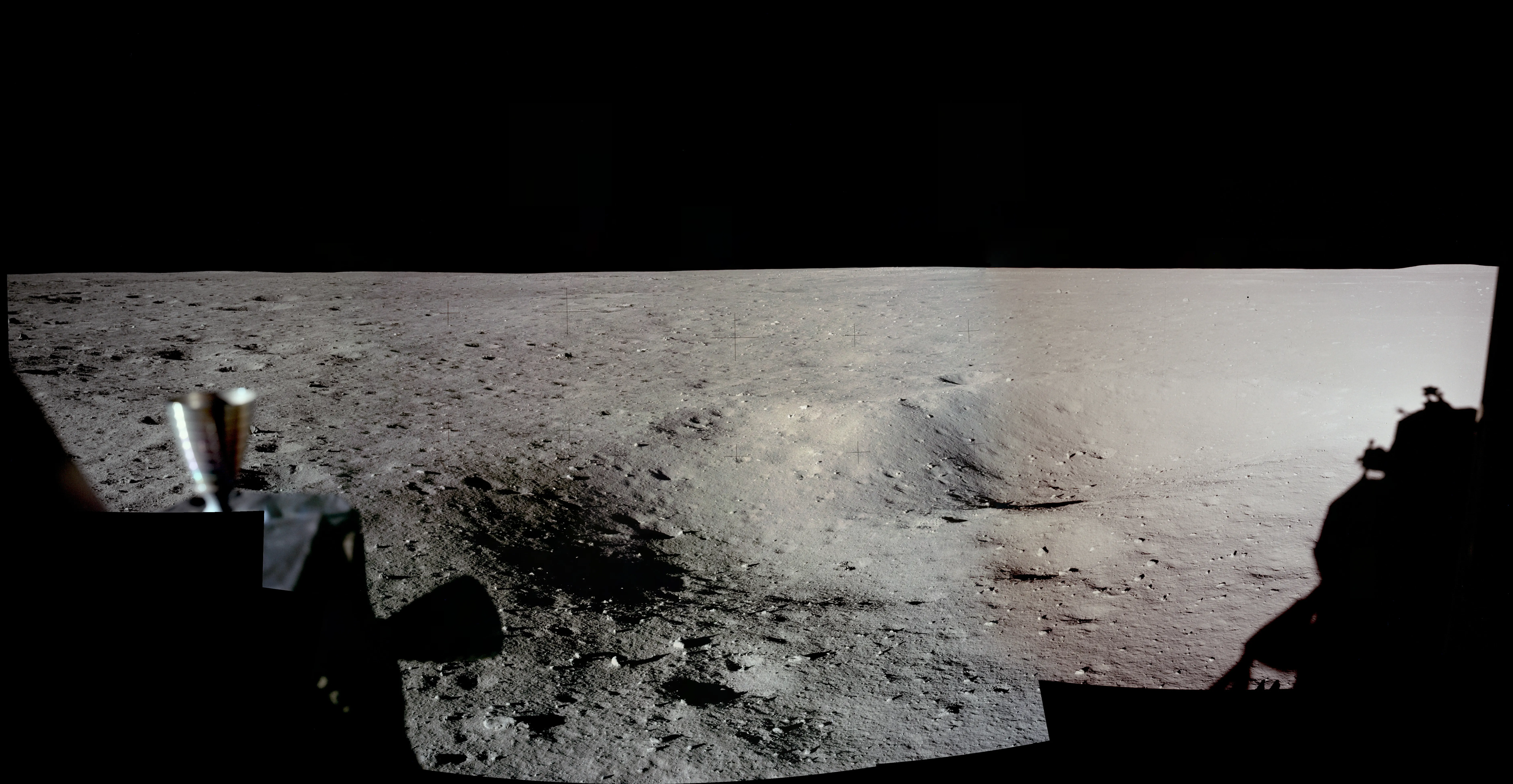
First composite panorama of Tranquility Base taken by Neil Armstrong about 75 minutes after Eagle's Landing

Table 11.1 Pre-EVA panoramas
Mission	Time (MET)	EVA #	Location	Astronaut	Magazine	Type	Start Frame	End Frame	Modern Panorama	Reference	Panorama Displayed at Reference	Notes
XI	103:59:47	Pre-EVA	CDR Window	Armstrong	37	Color	5449	5453	N/A	ALSJ		Composite image
XI	104:02:26	Pre-EVA	LMP Window	Aldrin	37	Color	5454	5458		ALSJ	N/A	
XI	104:03:18	Pre-EVA	CDR Window	Armstrong	39	Monochrome	5737	5739		ALSJ	N/A	Note: Right-to-left sweep of images.
XI	104:03:18	Pre-EVA	CDR Window	Armstrong	39	Monochrome	5741	5747		ALSJ	N/A	Note: Right-to-left sweep of images.
XI	104:03:18	Pre-EVA	CDR Window	Armstrong	39	Monochrome	5750	5755		ALSJ	N/A	Note: Right-to-left sweep of images.
XI	104:03:18	Pre-EVA	CDR Window	Armstrong	39	Monochrome	5756	5762		ALSJ	N/A	Note: Right-to-left sweep of images.
XI	104:03:18	Pre-EVA	LMP Window	Aldrin	39	Monochrome	5763	5770		ALSJ	N/A	
XI	104:03:18	Pre-EVA	LMP Window	Aldrin	39	Monochrome	5771	5774		ALSJ	N/A	
XI	104:03:18	Pre-EVA	LMP Window	Aldrin	39	Monochrome	5775	5779		ALSJ	N/A	
XI	104:03:18	Pre-EVA	CDR Window	Armstrong	40	Color	5847	5848		ALSJ		Note: Original sources are in color.

== EVA Panoramas ==
Although Apollo 11's Lunar Extravehicular Activity (EVA) would be the shortest of the whole Apollo program, it would yield the highest percentage of panoramic images of all the landings. Mission planning placed special emphasis on capturing panoramas and the final version of the Apollo 11 Lunar Surface Operations Plan had itemised the capture of at least 4 panoramas on the timeline and Armstrong managed to complete a couple more as well. Along the way, several "sequences of opportunity" presented themselves that could also be used to create panoramas. All told, when these 'mini-pans' are also considered, as many as 50% of the shots taken on the surface were intended for inclusion in multi-shot panoramas.

=== The First Surface Photographs - Panorama 1 ===
Although the collection of a 'Contingency Sample' was the highest priority objective for the mission, television and photographic coverage were listed as needing to be "performed in conjunction with several of the other objectives" and so were not assigned formal priorities. From numerous sources, including the ALSJ, "Go, Flight!", and Armstrong's biography "First Man", it is clear that there was a difference between the expectations of Mission Control and Armstrong as to what his first action should be on the surface. The timeline in the Lunar Surface Operations Plan (page 31) makes it clear that the contingency sample would be collected and stowed immediately prior to the transfer of the camera from the LM to the surface, and yet, the first item on Armstrong's on-cuff checklist is "Transfer Cam" - and the same checklist includes no reference to the collection of a contingency sample. Regardless, Armstrong called for the transfer of the camera just two and a half minutes after his "One small step" speech. During the next four minutes, Aldrin transfers the camera to Armstrong who mounts it on the bracket on the front of his chest unit. The transcript of the Flight Director's communication loop (as shown within the ALSJ) shows that Mission Control were expecting Armstrong to start the collection of the sample during this time and were prompting the CapCom (Bruce McCandless III) to remind him of this.

In defence of all the parties involved in this, there was a lot going on at the time:-

- For Armstrong, just a few minutes onto the surface, had not moved more than three or four paces from the foot of the ladder by this point
- For Aldrin, the film magazine in the DAC (Digital Acquisition Camera) had just run out and he was required by the mission rules to replace it before Armstrong could continue
- For the Flight Director (Cliff Charlesworth), there were a multitude of tasks that required his attention; as well as the regular "Go/No-Go" polling of his Flight Controllers, there were issues with the television feed from Tranquility Base and on the other communication channels too
- For the CapCom (Bruce McCandless III), whilst he may have been trying to allow his astronaut colleagues to "get on with the job", some audio comms breaks compounded the situation where either Armstrong did not hear the messages or Mission Control did not hear his responses

Regardless, at 109:30:53 MET, Armstrong announced "I'll step out and take some of my first pictures here" and began taking the sequence of pictures AS11-40-5850 to AS11-40-5858. In the 1969 technical debrief, Armstrong indicated that he wanted to complete a first set of (panoramic) photos without leaving the shadow of the LM whereas the contingency sample would have required moving "10 to 15 feet" away from the LM and into direct sunlight. In those first few minutes he clearly regarded that as too far. Unfortunately, the 5850-5858 sequence was incomplete; there is a discontinuation (i.e. a "gap") between 5851 and 5852, and then again between 5884 and 5885. Although the former is probably a simple alignment error on Armstrong's part, there is a fair chance that Mission Control's concern about the (lack of) Contingency Sample was a contributory factor to the latter. The combined TV/DAC camera/Photography/audio video hosted on YouTube as "Apollo 11 Moonwalk Part 1 of 4" includes the Flight Director's audio loop as well as the CapCom-Crew audio. At 8 minutes 53 seconds into the video (109:30:53 MET) Armstrong states "I'll step out and take some of my first pictures here.", at 9:03 video/109:31:05 MET CapCom broadcasts "Roger. Neil, we're reading you loud and clear. We see you getting some pictures and the contingency sample." There is no reaction to this by Armstrong, neither verbally nor in his movements captured on-camera. [Interestingly, CapCom's voice is echoed approximately 2 seconds after the original transmission, which is unlike his other communications.] At 10:18 video/109:32:19 MET, CapCom prompts again, "Neil, this is Houston. Did you copy about the contingency sample? Over.", which Armstrong immediately acknowledges. This occurs just around the time that Armstrong is preparing to take image 5855. Since Armstrong was required to make changes to the f-stop and/or focus settings on the camera for each shot in the panoramic sequence, this interruption may have led to him misjudging how far to turn to take 5855 and hence introduces the gap.

=== Panorama Locations ===
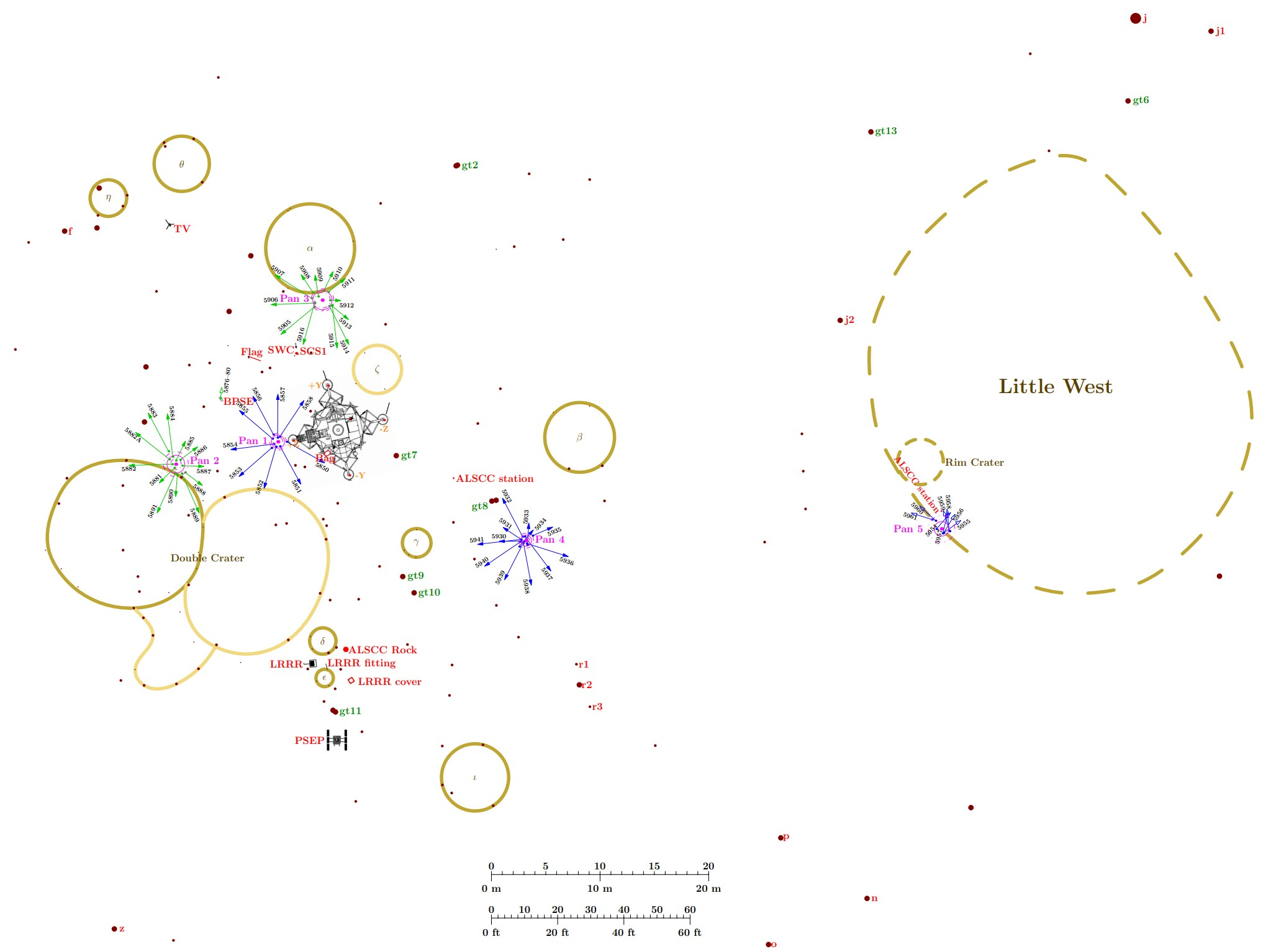
Schematic showing relative locations of Tranquility Base panoramas.

Note that Panoramas 1 through 5 are indicated as 'stars' on this schematic. The green panoramas (2 and 3) were taken by Aldrin, the blue 'stars' by Armstrong (1, 4, and 5). The rays of each star illustrate the direction that the images were taken in.

Table 11.2 EVA panoramas
Mission	Time (MET)	EVA #	Location	Astronaut	Magazine	Type	Start Frame	End Frame	Orientation	Reference	Panorama Displayed at Reference	Notes
XI	109:32:26	EVA 1	At the foot of the ladder - Panorama 1	Armstrong	40	Color	5850	5858	Map of component shots of Panorama 1 taken at Tranquility Base.	ALSJ		Gaps between 5851 and 5852, and 5854 and 5855. Only panoramic sweep captured by television coverage.
XI	109:33:00	EVA 1	Ladder Minipan	Armstrong	40	Color	5859	5861		ALSJ	Apollo 11 Ladder Mini-Pan taken by Neil Armstrong at Tranquility Base.	This is an unusual sequence as it made up of 5860-5859-5961 when viewed from left-to-right.
XI	109:41:28	EVA 1	Buzz on the Porch	Armstrong	40	Color	5864	5866		ALSJ	Buzz Aldrin on the porch of Apollo 11 Eagle	Again, an asynchronous sequence. The frame with Buzz was taken after the ground-based images.
XI	109:42:50	EVA 1	Buzz on the Footpad	Armstrong	40	Color	5864	5869		ALSJ	Buzz on the footpad of the LM Eagle at Tranquility Base	
XI	110:31:47	EVA 1	Panorama 2 (Plus-Z)	Aldrin	40	Color	5881	5891		LPI	Apollo 11 Panorama Station 2 - Taken by Buzz Aldrin	Tranquillity Base - Panorama 2 - Plus-Z - Taken by Buzz Aldrin
XI	110:42:14	EVA 1	Buzz and the Bulk Sample Area	Armstrong	40	Color	5901	5902		ALSJ	Buzz and the Bulk Sample Area at Tranquility Base	
XI	110:43:33	EVA 1	Panorama 3	Aldrin	40	Color	5905	5916		ALSJ	Tranquillity Base - Panorama 3 - Plus Y - Taken by Buzz Aldrin	
XI	110:53:38	EVA 1	Buzz Removing Passive Seismometer	Armstrong	40	Color	5928	5929		ALSJ	Buzz Removing Passive Seismometer - Taken by Neil Armstrong	
XI	110:53:38	EVA 1	Panorama 4	Armstrong	40	Color	5930	5941		ALSJ	Panorama 4 - Tranquility Base - Taken by Neil Armstrong	
XI	109:33:00	EVA 1	Panorama 5 - Little West Crater	Armstrong	40	Color	5954	5961		ALSJ	Panorama 5 - Tranquility Base - Taken by Neil Armstrong	Right-to-left sequence of images. (Armstrong's side-trip to Little West crater was 'off-plan' and he may have been in a hurry to snap a few shots.) Note that the reference image is monochrome.

== Post EVA Panoramas ==
Once the EVA had concluded, the only external view the astronauts had was through the LM windows that they had taken photos through before the EVA. Although no panoramas were explicitly called for in the Surface Plan for this time, the crew (predominantly Aldrin) continued to take photos and included the following panoramas in the period prior to ejecting their PLSS units onto the surface. As Aldrin notes to Mission Control at 112:20:56 MET, they are "using up what (Hasselblad) film we have."

Due to the disjoint nature of some of these images (i.e. they aren't contiguous enough to create a panoramic sequence) some contributors on ALSJ have applied "Artistic License" in the creation of composite panoramas. These have not been listed below, but are accessible via the ALSJ site. Also, there is no clear indication on the exact times that these images were taken, hence they are all marked to indicate when the overall activity is recorded in the ALSJ (i.e. Aldrin's message above).

Caption Table 11.3 Post-EVA panoramas
Mission	Time (MET)	EVA #	Location	Astronaut	Magazine	Type	Start Frame	End Frame	Panorama	Reference	Reference Panorama	Notes
XI	112:20:56	Post-EVA	LMP Window	Aldrin	39	Mono	5817	5824	Apollo 11 Post-EVA 9 - Taken by Buzz Aldrin	N/A	N/A	
XI	112:20:56	Post-EVA	LMP Window	Aldrin	39	Mono	5832	5835	Apollo 11 Post-EVA 1 - Taken by Buzz Aldrin	N/A	N/A	
XI	112:20:56	Post-EVA	LMP Window	Aldrin	37	Color	5860	5469	Apollo 11 Post-EVA 2 - Taken by Buzz Aldrin	N/A	N/A	
XI	112:20:56	Post-EVA	LMP Window	Aldrin	37	Color	5870	5476	Apollo 11 Post-EVA 3 - Taken by Buzz Aldrin	N/A	N/A	
XI	112:20:56	Post-EVA	LMP Window	Aldrin	37	Color	5477	5482	Apollo 11 Post-EVA 4 - Taken by Buzz Aldrin	N/A	N/A	
XI	112:20:56	Post-EVA	LMP Window	Aldrin	37	Color	5482	5487	Apollo 11 Post-EVA 5 - Taken by Buzz Aldrin	N/A	N/A	
XI	112:20:56	Post-EVA	LMP Window	Aldrin	37	Color	5488	5491	Apollo 11 Post-EVA 6 - Taken by Buzz Aldrin	N/A	N/A	
XI	112:20:56	Post-EVA	CDR Window	Armstrong(?)	37	Color	5496	5505	N/A	ALSJ	Apollo 11 Post-EVA 8 - Taken by Neil Armstrong(?)	
XI	112:20:56	Post-EVA	LMP Window	Aldrin	37	Color	5510	5517	Apollo 11 Post-EVA 7 - Taken by Buzz Aldrin	N/A	N/A	

== Post mission analysis ==
The primary purpose of taking the panoramic images was to provide the context, or placement, of the activities taken during the EVA. The initial analysis was presented in the Apollo 11 Preliminary Science Report that was released in October 1969 - just over 3 months after the mission. By 2009/2010, digital technologies had emerged that allowed the image archive to be revisited in much greater detail than previously. The Photogrammetric Analysis Of Apollo 11 Imagery was published in December 2013 and greatly enhances the depth of analysis of the archive. The images continue to be revisited periodically with new, cleaner, representations of the panoramas after being processed by increasingly sophisticated software packages. Examples of these include LPI's Apollo Surface Panorama page, NASA's Johnson Space Center (JSC) 'Anniversary' Panoramas,, Mike Constantine's Apollo: The Panoramas, and Andy Saunders' Apollo Remastered.

== See also ==
- Apollo 12
- Apollo 14
- Apollo 15
- Apollo 16

== Footnotes ==
The titles used in the 'Location' column of the tables use the terms defined in the Apollo Lunar Surface Journal/ALSJ panorama descriptions.

Two forms of panoramas are collated within the tables above; "Quick-and-Dirty" representations that were quickly assembled to provide a representation in the "Panorama" column of each table, and "official" images that are part of the ALSJ or similar source (referred to as "Reference Panorama" in the tables). Where a Reference Panorama is pre-existing, that has been used in preference to creating a new version. The Quick-and-Dirty versions were created using a photo-stitching software package using high-definition sources from the "Project Apollo Archive" on Flickr at https://www.flickr.com/people/projectapolloarchive/

All 4-digit 'Start Frame' and 'End Frame' references relate to the last 4 digits of the image names. The full image names follow the format AS11-MM-IIII, where MM relates to the Magazine number and IIII is the identifier.
