= Lunar Panoramic Photography - Apollo 12 =

Panoramic photos taken during the Apollo 12 lunar mission

NASA's Apollo Lunar Surface Journal (ALSJ) records the details of each mission's period on the lunar surface as a timeline of the activities undertaken, the dialogue between the crew and Mission Control, and the relevant documentary records. Each photograph taken on the mission is catalogued there and each photographic sequence (i.e. 'panorama') is also recorded. The panoramas would be in the form of a number of overlapping images that would be airbrushed together as a panoramic mosaic once the film had been processed back on Earth. By recording the site in this way, all other aspects of the mission to the surface could be placed in context. This page tabulates the Apollo 12 panoramas and, where appropriate, provides updated representations blended using more recent, digital, technologies than the originals.

Although the taking of panoramic photos on the surface featured highly in the plans of all the landings, the process by which the astronauts were trained to take them is not well recorded (Phinney is probably the best source). Although some members of the astronauts corps were acknowledged as being "camera buffs", the majority had little or no experience of the principles of photography, and all required training in the use of the chosen camera, the Hasselblad 500 EL, long considered as one of the best cameras available. As good as the cameras were, the astronauts had to overcome dealing without a viewfinder, and manually changing the aperture and exposure settings to make allowance for the low Sun angles, all while wearing a spacesuit. Each frame for a panoramic mosaic would require individual changes, for example.

== Context ==
Having proven the viability of landing on the Moon with Apollo , NASA extended the objectives of Apollo 12 in two key areas; executing a precision landing close to a known target, and extended surface EVA activities. The first was achieved when the Lunar Module, Intrepid, touched down within sight of Surveyor 3 which had landed on the Moon over 2 years previously. Whereas the Apollo 11 crew only had up to 150 minutes during their single EVA, the Apollo 12 crew more than tripled that amount over two Moonwalks, which included a visit to the Surveyor craft.

In terms of photography, almost four times as many photos were taken compared to its predecessor, with a similar proportion being used for panoramas. Unlike Apollo 11 though, a higher proportion of these were taken whilst on the surface rather than inside the LM before or after the EVAs.

The post-mission Preliminary Science Report indicates that the crew took 23 panoramas whereas the ALSJ records 29 examples. In some cases, the complete, 360° panoramas were impacted by the low Sun angle and greater detail can be gained by omitting the down-Sun exposures from the panoramic sequences. The report also indicated that the original panoramas were analysed "with high precision, from measurements of glass-plate reproductions of the photographs", whereas modern panorama technologies have rendered such approaches as obsolete.

To assist in gaining bearings, the Lunar Module (LM) Intrepid, landed with its door and ladder leg (AKA "+Z strut") pointing about 25° north of due west. The Sun's elevation was between 7.5° and 9.5° for EVA 1, and 15.8° and 17.8° for EVA 2.

== Panoramas taken from inside the Lunar Module ==
Following the successful landing of Apollo 11, the emphasis on collecting contingency photos and samples was greatly reduced for Apollo 12. The flight plan simply states "Describe & Photograph Lunar Surface" as the first action after the immediate post-landing activities (Page 133 Apollo 12 Flight Plan). Subsequently, there are 4 non-EVA panoramas taken from the LM on Apollo 12.

Caption Table 12.1 Non-EVA panoramas
Mission	Time (MET)	EVA #	Location	Astronaut	Magazine	Type	Start Frame	End Frame	Alternate Panorama	Source	Reference Panorama	Notes
XII	111:58:43	Pre-EVA	CDR Window	Conrad	48	Mono	7023	7027		ALSJ		Alternate panorama included to illustrate how stitched panoramas may vary according to their original content. The Reference panorama from the ALSJ (immediately to the left of this text box) omits the 7027 image but results in poor blending between the component images in the centre. The Alternate (furthest to the left) includes 7027, which resolves the poor blend, but now includes the Landing Point Designator that was etched on the surface of the window.
XII	111:58:43	Pre-EVA	LMP Window	Bean	48	Mono	7028	7033	N/A	ALSJ		
XII	120:10:34	Post-EVA-1	CDR/LMP Windows	Conrad/Bean	46	Color	6853	6867	N/A	ALSJ		This Reference Panorama has been manually arranged. Due to the source photos being taken from different locations (namely, the CDR and LMP windows) creating a full panorama requires a fair degree of image manipulation to render, hence the unblended representation of the result. The two following sub-panoramas show the individual views through the windows.
XII	120:10:34	Post-EVA-1	CDR Window	Conrad	46	Color	6853	6859		ALSJ	N/A	Sub-panorama - Blended representation of image above.
XII	120:10:34	Post-EVA-1	LMP Window	Bean	46	Color	6860	6867		ALSJ	N/A	Sub-panorama - Due to overlapping coverage and movement by the photographer, this image is made up of AS12-46-6863, 6865, 6866, and 6867 only.
XI	135:45:48	Post-EVA-2	CDR/LMP Windows	Conrad	48	Monochrome	7153	7171	N/A	ALSJ		This Reference Panorama has been manually arranged. Due to the source photos being taken from different locations (the CDR and LMP windows) creating a full panorama requires a fair degree of image manipulation to render, hence the unblended representation of the result. The two following sub-panoramas show the view through each of the windows.
XI	135:45:48	Post-EVA-2	CDR Window	Conrad	48	Monochrome	7153	7158		ALSJ	N/A	Sub-panorama - Blended representation of image above.
XI	135:45:48	Post-EVA-2	LMP Window	Bean	48	Monochrome	7159	7171		ALSJ	N/A	Sub-panorama using a subset of 7159-7171

== EVA Panoramas ==
Almost every historical reference on Apollo 12 notes the congeniality of the crew towards each other. This comes through in the dialogue between Pete Conrad and Al Bean during their EVAs, which was peppered with chuckles and giggles throughout, and also within the photos, with both taking "Tourist Shots" of the other at various points.

Despite Bean's issues with the TV camera, the standard of photography taken on the stills cameras is particularly striking - especially in the monochrome portraits (Not included here).

Table 12.2 EVA panoramas
Mission	Time (MET)	EVA #	Location	Astronaut	Magazine	Type	Start Frame	End Frame	Alternate Panorama	Source	Reference Panorama	Notes
XII	116:22:29	EVA 1	Pete's 12 O'clock LM Pan	Conrad	46	Color	6730	6745	N/A	ALSJ		
XII	116:24:47	EVA 1	Pete's 4 O'clock LM Pan	Conrad	46	Color	6746	6763	N/A	ALSJ		
XII	116:27:03	EVA 1	Pete's 8 O'clock LM Pan	Conrad	46	Color	6764	6782	N/A	ALSJ		
XII	116:27:03	EVA 1	Pete's 8 O'clock LM Pan	Conrad	46	Color	6776	6781	N/A	LPI		Sub-panorama of "Pete's 8 O'clock LM Pan" above
XII	116:27:03	EVA 1	Al photographing the plus-Y footpad	Conrad	46	Color	6777	6780	N/A	ALSJ		Sub-panorama of "Pete's 8 O'clock LM Pan" above - note, slightly wider than the LPI variant.
XII	116:57:52	EVA 1	Pete's ALSEP Site Pan	Conrad	46	Color	6796	6811	N/A	ALSJ		Alternate showing Al Bean's attached shadow.
XII	118:18:09	EVA 1	Pete's First Pan at Middle Crescent Crater	Conrad	46	Color	6836	6844	N/A	ALSJ		Later variant from HR sources.
XII	118:18:41	EVA 1	Pete's Second Pan at Middle Crescent Crater	Conrad	46	Color	6845	6852	N/A	ALSJ		
XII	118:28:21	EVA 1	Al's 12 O'Clock LM Pan	Bean	47	Color	6941	6960	N/A	ALSJ		Right to Left sequence. Early variant - Lo Res images
XII	118:30:43	EVA 1	Al's 6 O'Clock LM Pan	Bean	47	Color	6961	6981	N/A	ALSJ		Right to Left sequence. Early variant - Lo Res images
XII	118:33:10	EVA 1	Al's 4 O'Clock LM Pan	Bean	47	Color	6982	7006	N/A	ALSJ		Right to left sequence. Hi-Res version
XII	118:33:10	EVA 1	Mini-pan - Pete at MESA	Bean	47	Color	6987	6990		ALSJ		Sub-panorama of 'Al's 4 O'Clock LM Pan' above. Right to left sequence. Color alternative also provided.
XII	118:33:10	EVA 1	Mini-pan - Pete at MESA	Bean	47	Color	6984	6992		ALSJ		Sub-panorama of 'Al's 4 O'Clock LM Pan' above. Right to left sequence.
XII	118:33:10	EVA 1	Al's 4 O'Clock LM Pan	Bean	47	Color	6982	7006	N/A	LPI		
XII	132:12:17	EVA 2	Portrait of Head Crater	Conrad	49	Mono	7174	7186	N/A	ALSJ		This ALSJ-sourced panorama has been included as a counter-example - it isn't a panorama. Following the sequence from AS12-49-7174 to 7186 shows that the small rock formations in the centre of the left and right halves of the image are the same formation shot from different angles.
XII	132:31:20	EVA 2	Al's Triple Craters Pan	Bean	48	Mono	7056	7058		ALSJ		
XII	132:31:52	EVA 2	Pete's Head Crater Pan	Conrad	49	Mono	7201	7216	N/A	ALSJ		
XII	132:38:22	EVA 2	Pete's Left-to-Right Bench Crater Partial Pan	Conrad	49	Mono	7223	7228	N/A	ALSJ		Alternate variant -
XII	132:38:22	EVA 2	Pete's Right-to-Left Bench Crater Partial Pan	Conrad	49	Mono	7229	7233	N/A	ALSJ		
XII	132:53:22	EVA 2	Pete's Sharp Traverse Pan	Conrad	49	Mono	7244	7262	N/A	ALSJ		
XII	132:56:44	EVA 2	Pete's First Sharp Crater Partial Pan	Conrad	49	Mono	7263	7269		ALSJ		
XII	132:57:33	EVA 2	Sharp Crater Pan 2	Conrad	49	Mono	7270	7275		ALSJ		
XII	133:36:44	EVA 2	Al's Halo Crater Pan	Bean	49	Mono	7289	7311	N/A	ALSJ		
XII	133:45:26	EVA 2	Al's Partial Pan of Surveyor Crater	Bean	49	Mono	7323	7324	N/A	ALSJ		
XII	133:59:16	EVA 2	Al's 'Little Lines' Mini Pan	Bean	48	Mono	7094	7096	N/A	ALSJ		Alternate variant -
XII	134:06:25	EVA 2	Surveyor Scoop Arm	Bean	48	Mono	7101	7105	N/A	ALSJ		
XII	134:07:32	EVA 2	Surveyor Body and Arm (Not ALSJ)	Bean	48	Mono	7110	7116	N/A	N/A		This image is not referenced in the ALSJ. It has been created from a series of "stereo pairs" and other overlapping images, and this, along with Al Bean moving his position, has resulted in some image anomalies (uncorrected). Note that the sequence runs (left to right) 7116->7115->7114->7111->7110.
XII	134:40:09	EVA 2	Al's First Block Crater Partial Pan	Bean	48	Mono	7141	7143	N/A	ALSJ		
XII	134:40:09	EVA 2	Al's Second Block Crater Partial Pan	Bean	48	Mono	7144	7147	N/A	ALSJ		Hi Res variant

== Post mission analysis ==
The primary purpose of taking the panoramic images was to provide the context, or placement, of the activities undertaken during the EVAs. The initial analysis was presented in the Apollo 12 Preliminary Science Report. The images continue to be revisited periodically with new, cleaner, representations of the panoramas after being processed by increasingly sophisticated software packages. Examples of these include LPI's Apollo Surface Panorama page, NASA's Johnson Space Center (JSC) 'Anniversary' Panoramas, Mike Constantine's Apollo: The Panoramas, and Andy Saunders' Apollo Remastered.

== See also ==
- Apollo 11
- Apollo 14
- Apollo 15
- Apollo 16

== Footnotes ==
These tables catalogue the panoramic photos captured during the Apollo 12 mission. Those thumbnails in the "Reference Panorama" and "Notes" columns have been included from 'official' NASA resources such as ALSJ and LPI. Entries in the 'Alternate Panorama' column have been assembled using panorama-blending software fed with the high resolution scans of the original frames held within the "Project Apollo Archive" on Flickr. Where a Reference Panorama is pre-existing, that has been used in preference to creating a new variant, unless there is additional value to be gained by regenerating it. Apart from some source image masking, all such new variants have been created using the minimum of processing, relying on the software package's inherent blending and optimisation capabilities - typically, such panoramas have been created within 3-5 minutes as they are intended to be 'representations' rather than 'definitive' examples. Sub-panoramas follow the full panorama and are denoted using green highlighting.

All 4-digit 'Start Frame' and 'End Frame' references relate to the last 4 digits of the image names. The full image names follow the format AS12-MM-IIII, where MM relates to the Magazine number and IIII is the identifier.

All tabular data, such as time and image identifiers, has been extracted from the ALSJ. The entries in the 'Location' column relate to the term used for the panorama as listed in the ALSJ's 'Assembled Panoramas' section.
