= Réseau plate =

Transparent camera lens attachment used to aid in scientific measurements

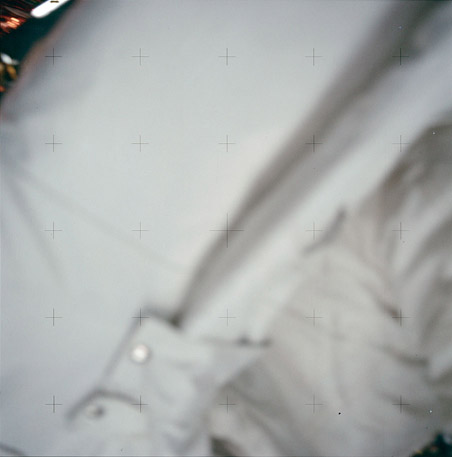
An accidental exposure from the Hasselblad lunar surface data camera showing the réseau crosses.

A réseau plate is a transparent sheet of glass or plastic engraved with a grid of crosshatches called fiducial markers. It was commonly used in film cameras (before the advent of digital cameras) for scientific and technical photography. The plate is placed at the focal plane of the camera just in front of the film. When the frame is exposed the fiducial markers scatter incoming light, creating a permanent shadow on the negative.

== Etymology ==
The term réseau is borrowed from French, meaning "network". The fiducial markers on a réseau plate are sometimes called reticles. The Latin root of fiducial means trust, confidence; fiducial markers are trustworthy reference points. The Latin root of reticle means small meshwork bag, small net; a grid of reticles has a net-like appearance.

== Purpose and function ==
If the film negative is properly printed the fiducial markers will be evenly spaced on the positive image. Uneven spacing reveals that the image has been distorted. Identical spacing on adjacent images (e.g. from a series of aerial photos) ensures that printing magnification is consistent. Irregularities in the grid can also result from incorrect positioning of the film in the camera, physical distortion of the film media in the development process, and (if digitally scanned) the nonlinearity of the image scanner. These errors may be visually imperceptible but limit the precision of measurements. Because the position of the marks is very precisely known, the image can easily be corrected to account for these effects. When used for photogrammetry, multiple images can be combined using the fiducial marks and knowledge of the camera geometry to enable measurement of distances between objects in the images.

Fiducial markers are generally unnecessary for digital cameras because the physical pixel structure of the sensor itself inherently provides a source of geometric reference.

== Use on lunar cameras ==
The Hasselblad lunar surface data camera used on the Apollo Moon missions was fitted with a réseau plate made of glass and fitted to the back of the camera body, extremely close to the film plane. The plate was 5.4 × 5.4 cm in the film plane, which was the useful exposure area on the 70 mm film.

The réseau plate was engraved with a 5 × 5 grid of crosses. The intersections of the crosses were 10 mm apart and accurately calibrated to a tolerance of 0.002 mm. Except for the double-sized central cross, each of the four arms on a cross was 1 mm long and 0.02 mm wide. The crosses (also known as fiducials) were recorded on every exposed frame and provided a means of determining angular distances between objects in the field-of-view.

When the Hasselblad lunar surface data camera was fitted with a 60 mm lens, the images of the réseau crosses on the film have an apparent separation of 10.3 degrees. With a 500 mm lens fitted, the apparent separation is 1.24 degrees.
