= Silicon Genesis Project =

Oral Histories of Early Silicon Valley Founders and Contributors

- Location: United States
- Type: Oral Histories
- Affiliation: Stanford University Library
- Silicon Valley Archives: Laila Razouk
- Period covered: 1950-current

Building information
- Building: Cecil H. Green Library
- Website: https://exhibits.stanford.edu/silicongenesis

The Silicon Genesis Project is an on-going oral history project on the history of Silicon Valley and the semiconductor industry, conducted by volunteers and housed at the Stanford University Library.

== History ==
The Silicon Genesis project was started and built upon the inspiration of Rob Walker (1935-2016). Rob was a Silicon Valley native and Silicon Valley educated electrical engineer, who was involved with the semiconductor industry since the 1960s at Fairchild, Intel and as a founder of LSI Logic. He understood that if the stories of these pioneers were not captured for the benefit of future public access, they would be untold and lost forever. In 1995, Rob began a project with the Silicon Valley Archives in the Stanford University Libraries to record oral history interviews focused on the history of the semiconductor industry. The resulting video recordings and interview transcripts form the basis for the Silicon Genesis collection at Stanford, and available for researchers and others with an interest in this history.

== Role of Stanford University ==
The Silicon Valley Archives in the Stanford Libraries provides access to several collections related to the Silicon Genesis oral histories. These include the Rob Walker Papers, the Silicon Destiny collection of oral history cassette tapes, videos, and transcripts assembled for Rob Walker's book Silicon Destiny, and the Silicon Genesis collection, which includes physical media for many of the interviews in the series featured in the exhibit.

== The collection of interviews ==
=== Interviews ===
Subjects to be interviewed have been chosen based on their historic contributions to the semiconductor and related industries. Persons conducting the interviews are former executives of semiconductor companies and have expertise in the fields being discussed. These individuals have volunteered their time to identify persons of historic interest, scheduled and conducted interviews, assist with post-production, and review transcripts. Once posted, interviews are available as both streaming video files and lightly edited transcripts.

=== Interview format ===
Prior to 2020, most interviews were typically conducted one-on-one in an informal and comfortable setting, often the home of the interviewee. More recent interviews have been conducted on the Stanford campus, often the Green Library. Interviews start with a bit of family and personal history, educational background, and then dive a range of relevant topics relating to the subject's historical contributions to the semiconductor or related industry.

=== Individual interviews ===
| Subject | Year | Affiliations | Interviewer |
|---|---|---|---|
| Amelio, Gil | 2000 | Bell Labs, National, Apple | Rob Walker |
| Balletto, Jack | 2012 | Lockheed, Western Microwave, GME, Fairchild, Ricoh, Synertek, VLSI | Rob Walker |
| Beyer, Richard M. | 2018 | National, VLSI Technology, Intersil, SIA, Freescale (Motorola) | Robert N. Blair |
| Blair, Robert N. | 2011 | Marconi, SGS-Fairchild, Fairchild, LSI Logic, Crosspoint, Monterey Design | Rob Walker |
| Borovoy, Roger | 2024 | Fish & Richardson, Intel | David Laws |
| Bourgoin, John | 2023 | Motorola, AMD, Silicon Graphics, MIPS | Laila Razouk |
| Brokaw, Paul | 2006 | Analog Devices | Rob Walker |
| Brooks, Don | 2000 | Texas Instruments, Fairchild, TSMC, UMC | Rob Walker |
| Burkett, Marvin | 2023 | AMD, Nvidia | Laila Razouk |
| Carter, Dennis | 2004 | Rockwell, Intel | Rob Walker |
| Chang, Morris | 2007 | Sylvania, Texas Instruments, TSMC, SEMI | Anon CHM |
| Corrigan, Wilfred | 1998 | Transitron, Motorola, Fairchild, LSI Logic | Rob Walker |
| Cotter, Ruth | 2023 | AMD | Laila Razouk |
| Darringer, John A. | 2017 | Philips, IBM | Robert N. Blair |
| Davidow, William (Bill) H. | 2016 | General Electric, Hewlett-Packard, Signetics, Intel, Mohr Davidow Ventures | Robert N. Blair |
| de Geus, Aart | 2016 | General Electric, Synopsis | Robert N. Blair |
| der Torossian, Papken | 2018 | Hewlett-Packard, Spectra Physics, Plantronics, ECS Microsystems, SVG | Robert N. Blair |
| DeWolf, Nick | 2005 | General Electric, Transitron, Texas Instruments, Teradyne | Craig Addison |
| Dickson, John | 2016 | Plessy, Texas Instruments, ICL, Headland Technologies, AT&T, Lucent, LSI Logic | Robert N. Blair |
| Diller, James | 2017 | Transitron, Fairchild, National, PMC Sierra | Robert N. Blair |
| Downey, James | 1995 | General Electric, Fairchild, AMD, Read/Write, DasTech | Rob Walker |
| Doyle, Norman Patrick | 2018 | Fairchild, Altera | Robert N. Blair, Geri Hadley |
| East, John | 2008 | Fairchild, AMD, Actel | Rob Walker |
| Faggin, Federico | 1995 | Olivetti, Fairchild, Intel, Zilog, Cygnet, Synaptics | Rob Walker |
| Federman, Irwin | 2015 | Monolithic Memories (MMI), AMD, USVP, SIA | Robert N. Blair |
| Fernandez, Manuel (Manny) | 2024 | ITT, Harris, Gavilan, Dataquest, Zilog, Gartner, Sysco | Laila Razouk |
| Fullagar, David | 2018 | Ferranti, Transitron, Fairchild, Intersil, Maxim | Robert N. Blair |
| Gallagher, David | 2005 | GCA, SEMI | Craig Addison |
| Gallagher, Ted | 2005 | Tegal, Matrix Integrated Systems, Motorola, SEMI | Craig Addison |
| Gifford, Jack | 2002 | Fairchild, AMD, Maxim | Rob Walker |
| Gray, Paul | 1998 | UC Berkeley, Fairchild R&D | Rob Walker |
| Hailey, Kim & Shawn | 1997 | Meta Software | Rob Walker |
| Hadley, Geri | 2019 | Fairchild, VLSI Technology, LSI Logic | David Laws, Robert N. Blair |
| Halla, Brian | 2006 | Control Data, Intel, LSI Logic, National | Rob Walker |
| Harrel, Sam | 2004 | Texas Instruments, Computervision, Micronix, KLA Tencor, SEMI-SEMATECH | Craig Addison |
| Hartman, Robert | 2018 | Standard Oil, Rockwell, Electronic Arrays, Fairchild, Signetics, Source III, Altera | Robert N. Blair |
| Hennessy, John | 2005 | Stanford, MIPS, Stanford | Rob Walker |
| Hiveley, Jim | 2017 | Motorola, Fairchild, Texas Instruments, RCA, Monolithic Memories, LSI Logic | Robert N. Blair |
| Hodgson, Richard | 1995 | Fairchild, Intel | Rob Walker |
| Hogan, C. Lester | 1995 | Bell Labs, Motorola, Fairchild | Rob Walker |
| Hoff, Marcian "Ted" | 1995 | Intel, Atari, Teklicon | Rob Walker |
| Holbrook, Tony | 2024 | AMD, MIPS | Laila Razouk |
| House, Dave | 2005 | Raytheon, Honeywell, Motorola, Intel, Bay Networks, Nortel | Rob Walker |
| Huang, Jen-Hsun | 2010 | AMD, LSI Logic, Nvidia | Rob Walker |
| Lam, David | 2007 | Texas Instruments, Xerox, Hewlett-Packard, Lam Research | Craig Addison |
| Last, Jay T. | 2007 | Shockley Labs, Fairchild | Craig Addison |
| Laws, David | 2013 | Fairchild, AMD, Altera | Robert N. Blair |
| Lowood, Henry | 2026 | Stanford University Libraries | Laila Razouk |
| Kawanishi, Tsuyoshi | 2011 | Toshiba Semiconductor, SMIC | Rob Walker |
| Kesting, Curt | 2006 | Fairchild, ST Microelectronics | Horst Sandfort (in German) |
| Koford, Jim | 1999 | IBM, Fairchild, Monterey Design Systems | Rob Walker |
| Kvamme, Floyd | 2013 | Fairchild, National, Apple, Kleiner-Perkins | Robert N. Blair |
| Markkula, Mike | 2014 | Fairchild, Intel, Apple, Echelon | Robert N. Blair |
| Martinotti, Piero | 2013 | SGS-Fairchild, Motorola, Weber Carburetor, SGS, ST Semiconductor | Robert N. Blair |
| Malone, Joe | 2023 | Fairchild | David Laws |
| Marren, Bernie | 2008 | Avco, Fairchild, Western Micro, AMI, SIA, OPTi | Rob Walker |
| Mazor, Stan | 2000 | Fairchild, Intel, Silicon Compilers | Rob Walker |
| McCoy, Tom | 2025 | AMD, O'Melveny & Meyers, CH2M Hill | |
| McCranie, Dan | 2016 | General Dynamics, Signetics, Harris, SEEQ, Cypress, Actel | Robert N. Blair |
| McCullough, Jack | 1990 | Eitel-McCullough, Inc | Anon |
| McKenna, Regis | 1995 | General Microelectronics, National, Regis McKenna, Inc | Rob Walker |
| McNeilly, Michael | 2004 | Union Carbide, Apogee Chemicals, Applied Materials, SEMI | Craig Addison |
| Mensch, William | 1995 | Motorola, Philco-Ford, MOS Technology, Commodore Computer | Rob Walker |
| Moore, Gordon | 1995 | Shockley Labs, Fairchild, Intel | Rob Walker |
| Morgan, Jim | 2004 | Textron, Applied Materials | Rob Walker |
| Murphy, K.C. | 2024 | Scientific Atlanta, AMD, Cadence, Next I/O, Pivotal | Laila Razouk |
| Newhagen, Paul | 2019 | Raychem, Fairchild, Source III, Altera | David Laws, Laila Razouk |
| Pausa, Clements E. | 2017 | Fairchild, National | Robert N. Blair |
| Palmer, Robert B. | 2004 | Texas Instruments, Mostek, Digital Equipment Corporation | Craig Addison |
| Parker, Gerry | 2003 | Mobil Oil, Hewlett-Packard, Fairchild, Intel | Rob Walker |
| Pierce, John | 1995 | Bell Labs, Caltech, Stanford | Rob Walker |
| Pistorio, Pasquale | 2011 | SGS, ST Microelectronics | Rob Walker |
| Previte, Rich | 2025 | Philco, General Micro-electronics, AMD, GlobalFoundries | Laila Razouk |
| Razouk, Laila | 2022 | AMD, Fantasma Networks, Bio Vitesse | David Laws |
| Rhines, Waldon | 2015 | Texas Instruments, Mentor Graphics | Robert N. Blair |
| Rock, Arthur | 2002 | Venture Capital | Rob Walker |
| Rogers, T. J. | 2013 | AMI, AMD, Cypress | Robert N. Blair |
| Rotsky, George | 1995 | Journalist | Rob Walker |
| Salisbury, Philip | 2025 | Fairchild, Intel, Seeq | Laila Razouk |
| Sanders, W. Jerry | 2002 | Douglas Aircraft, Motorola, Fairchild, AMD | Rob Walker |
| Sandfort, Horst G. | 2007 | Litronix, Fairchild, LSI Logic, Intellon | Rob Walker |
| Scalise, George | 2003 | Motorola, Fairchild, AMD, Apple, Semiconductor Industry Association | Rob Walker |
| Schütze, Dr. Hans J. | 2006 | Texas Instruments Europe | Horst Sandfort (in German) |
| Segal, Ed | 2004 | Applied Materials, Transpacific, Metron, SEMI | Craig Addison |
| Sello, Harry | 1995 | Shockley Labs, Fairchild, SGS | Rob Walker |
| Skurko, Robert | 2017 | Fairchild | Robert N. Blair |
| Sonsini, Larry | 2003 | Davis and Rock, Wilson Sonsini Goodrich & Rosati | Rob Walker |
| Sopkin, Elliot | 2013 | Fairchild, AMD | Geri Hadley |
| Sporck, Charlie | 2000 | General Electric, Fairchild, National | Rob Walker |
| Sprague, Peter | 2012 | National, Sprague Industries, Aston Martin Lagonda | Robert N. Blair |
| Strata, Ray | 2006 | Analog Devices | Rob Walker |
| Swanson, Bob | 2006 | Transitron, Fairchild, National, Linear Technology | Rob Walker |
| Tedlow, Richard S. | 2008 | Harvard Business School (discusses IBM, DEC, Intel, AMD,..) | Rob Walker |
| Valentine, Don | 2004 | Fairchild, National, Sequoia Capital | Rob Walker |
| Harold, Vitale | 2009 | Fairchild, Genrad, LTX/Trillium, Credence | Rob Walker |
| Vonderschmitt, Bernard | 1995 | RCA, Zilog, Xilinx | Rob Walker |
| Walker, Rob | 1998 | Ford Aerospace, Fairchild, Intel, LSI Logic, Silicon Genesis Project | Susan Ayers Walker |
| Weinig, Sheldon | 2006 | Materials Research Corporation | Craig Addison |
| Wells, George | 2010 | ITT, Fairchild, LSI Logic, Exar | Rob Walker |
| Wetlessen, Gunnar | 2018 | AMI, Synertek, VLSI Technology | Robert N. Blair |
| Wilder, Marshall | 2025 | AMD, Synergy Semiconductor, Tropian, Global Locate, Broadcom | Laila Razouk |
| Wolken, Peter | 2007 | RCA, Beckman Instruments, General Electric, Computervision, SEMI | Craig Addison |
| Yawata, Keisuke (KK) | 2007 | NEC, LSI Logic, Applied Materials | Rob Walker |
| Yoshida, Shoichiro | 2004 | Nikon, SEMI | Craig Addison |
| Yu, Albert | 2005 | Fairchild, Intel | Rob Walker |
| Zelencik, Steve | 2013 | Amphenol, Fairchild, AMD | Robert N. Blair |
| Zetes, Arthur | 2017 | Clevite Semiconductor, Fairchild, Rheem, Lockheed | Robert N. Blair |

=== Group interviews ===
| Subjects | Year | Affiliations | Interviewer |
|---|---|---|---|
| Steve Allen, Lawrence Bender, Richard Steinheimer | 1995 | Fairchild, National, Leapfrog | Rob Walker |
| Robert Ulrickson, John Nichols | 1995 | Fairchild | Rob Walker |
| Bob Dobbins, Jim Williams | 2006 | Linear Technology | Rob Walker |
| Martin Cooper, Arlene Harris | 2007 | Motorola, Dyna, GreatCall | Rob Walker |

=== Panel and special interest videos ===
| Title | Year Posted | Notes |
|---|---|---|
| George Rotsky - Journalist | 1995 | Electronic Design, EDN, EE Times |
| The Fairchild Chronicles | 2005 | A nearly three hour documentary on the history of Fairchild Semiconductor |
| Silicon Genesis Europe - Roundtable | 2006 | Six European semi executives. Recorded @ Electronica. In German |
| Rob Walker standup | 2006 | Outtakes from Silicon Genesis interviews |
| Fairchild 50th Anniversary Panel | 2007 | Julius Blank, Jay Last, Gordon Moore, and Arthur Rock. Audio only. Hosted by John Hennessy. Moderated by Leslie Berlin |
| Silicon Genesis 30th Anniversary Celebration | 2025 | Michael Keller, Henry Lowood, Laila Razouk, John East |

== Highlighted collections ==
The Stanford Library highlights individual interviews that are grouped together according to an area of interest. As of January 2025, there were 18 featured collections from companies, venture capital and industry associations SEMI and the Semiconductor Industry Association.
