= Very High Speed Integrated Circuit Program =

1980s U.S. government research program

The Very High Speed Integrated Circuit (VHSIC) Program was a United States Department of Defense (DOD) research program that ran from 1980 to 1990. Its mission was to research and develop very high-speed integrated circuits for the United States Armed Forces.

== Program ==
VHSIC was launched in 1980 as a joint tri-service (Army/Navy/Air Force) program. The program led to advances in integrated circuit materials, lithography, packaging, testing, and algorithms, and created numerous computer-aided design (CAD) tools. A well-known part of the program's contribution is VHDL (VHSIC Hardware Description Language), a hardware description language (HDL). The program also redirected the military's interest in GaAs ICs back toward the commercial mainstream of CMOS circuits.

More than $1 billion in total was spent on the VHSIC program for silicon integrated circuit technology development.

A DARPA project which ran concurrently, the VLSI Project, having begun two years earlier in 1978, contributed BSD Unix, the RISC processor, the MOSIS research design fab, and greatly furthered the Mead and Conway revolution in VLSI design automation. By contrast, the VHSIC program was comparatively less cost-effective for the funds invested over a contemporaneous time frame, though the projects had different final objectives and are not entirely comparable for that reason.

By the time the program ended in 1990, commercial processors were far outperforming what the Pentagon's program had produced; however, it did manage to subsidize US semiconductor equipment manufacturing, stimulating an industry that shipped much of its product abroad (mainly to Asia).
