= Michael Keller =

Michael or Mike Keller may refer to:

- Michael Keller (filmmaker), American filmmaker
- Michael Keller (sound engineer), American sound engineer
- Michael A. Keller (born 1945), American academician and librarian
- Mike Keller (born 1949), American football player
- Michael Keller (bishop) (1896–1961), bishop of the Roman Catholic Diocese of Münster
- Michael Keller (chess composer) (born 1949), German International Grandmaster for chess compositions
- Mike Keller, guitarist with Letters from the Fire

== See also ==
- Mike Kellar (fl. 2000s–2020s), American football coach
