= Richard M. Beyer =

American businessperson

Richard M. Beyer was the chairman and CEO of Freescale Semiconductor from 2008 until 2012.

== Early life and career ==
Beyer served three years as an officer in the United States Marine Corps. He holds a BS and MS from Georgetown University and an MBA from Columbia Business School.

Beyer served as president and CEO of Elantec Semiconductor for 2000 to 2002. He served as CEO of Intersil from 2002 to 2008. He joined Freescale Semiconductor in 2008 as CEO and resigned as CEO in May 2012. Prior to joining Elantec, Beyer served as president, chief operating officer and director of VLSI Technology from 1996 to 1998. Prior to his term at VLSI, he was executive vice president and chief operating officer of National Semiconductor from 1995 to 1996 and president of National Semiconductor's Communications and Computing Group from 1993 to 1995.

In 2012, Beyer won the EE Times ACE award for Executive of the Year.
