= Mead–Conway VLSI chip design revolution =

Structural change in integrated circuit design in the 1980s

The Mead–Conway VLSI chip design revolution, or Mead and Conway revolution, was a very-large-scale integration (VLSI) design revolution starting in 1978 which resulted in a worldwide restructuring of academic materials in computer science and electrical engineering education, and was paramount for the development of industries based on the application of microelectronics. (Note: See Chapter 2.)

A prominent factor in promoting this design revolution throughout industry was the DARPA-funded VLSI Project instigated by Carver Mead and Lynn Conway which spurred development of electronic design automation.

== Details ==
When the integrated circuit was originally invented and commercialized, the initial chip designers were co-located with the physicists, engineers and factories that understood integrated circuit technology. At that time, fewer than 100 transistors would fit in an integrated circuit "chip". The design capability for such circuits was centered in industry, with universities struggling to catch up. Soon, the number of transistors which fit in a chip started doubling every year and since 1975 has been doubling every two years. Much more complex circuits could then fit on a single chip, but the device physicists who fabricated the chips were not experts in electronic circuit design, so their designs were limited more by their expertise and imagination than by limitations in the technology.

In 1978–79, when approximately 20,000 transistors could be fabricated in a single chip, Carver Mead and Lynn Conway wrote the textbook Introduction to VLSI Systems. It was published in 1979 and became a bestseller, since it was the first VLSI (Very Large Scale Integration) design textbook usable by non-physicists. The authors intended the book to fill a gap in the literature and introduce electrical engineering and computer science students to integrated system architecture. This textbook triggered a breakthrough in education, as well as in industry practice. Computer science and electrical engineering professors throughout the world started teaching VLSI system design using this textbook. Many of them also obtained a copy of Lynn Conway's notes from her famous MIT course in 1978, which included a collection of exercises.

An important milestone that followed was the Multi Project Chip (MPC) concept that allowed multiple designs to be fabricated on a single wafer, greatly reducing cost to the point that students' design exercises and prototypes could be fabricated in small numbers. The first successful run of an MPC line was demonstrated at Lynn Conway's 1978 VLSI design course at MIT. A few weeks after completion of their designs, the students had the fabricated prototypes in their hands, available for testing. Lynn Conway's improved new Xerox PARC MPC VLSI implementation system and service was operated successfully for a dozen universities by late 1979. Computer scientist Danny Cohen then transferred the technology to the University of Southern California Information Sciences Institute, creating the Metal Oxide Semiconductor Implementation Service (MOSIS), which has evolved since 1981 into a national infrastructure for fast-turnaround prototyping of VLSI chip designs by universities and researchers.

In 1980, the Defense Advanced Research Projects Agency began the DoD's new VLSI research project to support extensions of this work. This resulted in many university and industry researchers learning and improving the Mead–Conway innovations. They rapidly spread around the world. Many regional Mead and Conway scenes were organized, such as the German multi-university E.I.S. project.
