= Silicon compiler =

Electronic design automation software tool

A silicon compiler is a specialized electronic design automation (EDA) tool that automates the process of creating an integrated circuit (IC) design from a high-level behavioral description. The tool takes a specification, often written in a high-level programming language like C++ or a specialized domain-specific language (DSL), and generates a set of layout files (such as GDSII) that can be sent to a semiconductor foundry for manufacturing.

The primary goal of a silicon compiler is to raise the level of design abstraction, allowing engineers to focus on the desired functionality of a circuit rather than the low-level details of its implementation. This process, sometimes called hardware compilation, significantly increases design productivity, similar to how modern software compilers freed programmers from writing assembly code.

== History ==
The concept of the silicon compiler was first formally described in 1979 by David L. Johannsen in his Ph.D. thesis at the Caltech, under the guidance of his adviser, Carver Mead. This work led to the founding of Silicon Compilers Inc. (SCI) in 1981 by Johannsen, Mead, and Edmund K. Cheng.

One of the first major successes of this approach was the design of an Ethernet Data Link Controller chip in 1982. The project went from specification to tape-out in just five months, a significant acceleration of the design cycle at the time. Shortly after, in 1983–84, the SCI team designed the data-path chip for the DEC MicroVAX in seven months. The chip contained 37,000 transistors, a level of complexity that typically required around three years to design manually.

== Compilation process ==
Silicon compilation transforms a high-level description into a physical layout through several major stages.

=== High-level synthesis ===
The process begins with a behavioral description of the hardware, often written in a language like C, C++, or SystemC. This stage, known as High-level synthesis (HLS), translates the high-level code into a structural representation, typically a register-transfer level (RTL) description. HLS allows designers to explore different architectures quickly by modifying the source code, rather than manually re-writing RTL code.

=== Intermediate representation ===
To bridge the gap between high-level programming languages and low-level hardware details, compilers often use an intermediate representation (IR). An IR provides a standardized format that allows for modular, hardware-focused optimizations. Modern open-source projects have introduced specialized IRs to improve the compilation process.

- CIRCT (Circuit IR for Compilers and Tools) is an LLVM-based project that aims to create a common infrastructure for hardware design tools. It provides a set of modular IRs (called “dialects”) to represent different levels of hardware abstraction, improving on traditional, less-flexible formats like Verilog.
- Calyx is an IR designed to enable optimizations that require both structural and control-flow information. It features a unique split representation with a hardware-like structural language and a software-like control language (with loops and conditionals), which allows for powerful, hardware-specific optimizations that are difficult to perform on traditional IRs.

=== Logic synthesis ===
The logic synthesis stage takes the RTL description and converts it into a gate-level netlist. This netlist is a detailed map of simple logic gates (like AND, OR, NOT) and the connections between them that implement the functionality specified in the RTL.

=== Physical design ===
Physical design is the final stage, where the abstract gate-level netlist is converted into a geometric layout. This layout specifies the exact location of every component and wire on the final chip. This stage includes several complex steps:

- Floorplanning: The overall arrangement of the major functional blocks on the chip is planned. This step determines the size and shape of the chip and is critical for performance and power consumption. Optimization often involves metaheuristic algorithms to explore the vast design space.
- Placement: The individual logic gates and standard cells from the netlist are assigned to specific locations on the chip.
- Routing: The physical wires that connect the placed components are created. This is a highly complex task, especially with modern process technologies that have a large number of intricate design rules.

== Design paradigms and optimization ==
=== Intelligent compilation ===
Early silicon compilers evolved to include more sophisticated design exploration capabilities. The concept of “intelligent compilation” introduced a design paradigm that separates decision-making from the synthesis process. In this model, designers use a “knobs and gauges” approach.

- Gauges are design quality metrics, such as chip area, cost, and performance, generated by the compiler.
- Knobs are high-level parameters and constraints that the designer can adjust, such as the number of processing units or the level of pipelining.

This allows a human designer or an expert system to explore trade-offs by adjusting the knobs and observing the effect on the gauges, without needing to understand the low-level details of the synthesis process.

=== Role of AI and machine learning ===
Modern silicon compilers increasingly incorporate artificial intelligence (AI) and machine learning (ML) to manage the immense complexity of chip design. These techniques are used to automate and optimize various stages of the compilation process, particularly physical design. For example, deep reinforcement learning has been used to solve chip floorplanning and placement problems, where an AI agent learns through experience to arrange components on a chip more effectively than many human experts and traditional automated tools.

== Comparison with manual RTL design ==
The use of silicon compilers presents a fundamental trade-off between design productivity and the final quality of the hardware.

Advantages:

- Increased productivity: The primary benefit is a dramatic reduction in design time. A 2018 study surveying numerous projects found that using HLS reduced development time to about one-third of that required for manual RTL design. This translated to a designer achieving, on average, 4.4 times more performance per design hour.
- Easier design space exploration: Because changes can be made at a high level of abstraction, engineers can experiment with different architectures and algorithms much more rapidly.

Disadvantages:

- Quality of Results : The abstraction can come at a cost. Designs generated by HLS tools often have lower performance and use more chip area and power than a hand-tuned RTL design. The same 2018 study found that HLS designs, on average, consumed 41% more resources on an FPGA than their manual RTL counterparts. However, this gap is narrowing as compiler technology improves.

== Open source movement ==
In recent years, the field of silicon compilation has seen a significant push towards open-source tools and collaborative development, aiming to democratize chip design and accelerate innovation.

- The CIRCT Project: Launched as part of the LLVM ecosystem, the CIRCT (Circuit IR for Compilers and Tools) project aims to apply modern compiler design principles to hardware. By providing a shared, modular infrastructure, CIRCT seeks to end the fragmentation of the EDA tool landscape and foster a community around a common set of powerful, reusable tools, much like LLVM did for software development.
- SiliconCompiler: SiliconCompiler is an open-source build system that automates the entire silicon compilation flow, from source code to GDSII files. Its goal is to standardize the compilation process by providing a modular framework with a standardized schema and API. This allows different tools, process design kits (PDKs), and designs to be combined seamlessly, simplifying the complex task of building a chip.

== See also ==
- Electric (software)
- High-level synthesis
- Electronic design automation
- Hardware description language
