= Manuel Fernandez (businessman) =

American engineer and businessman

- Born: April 22, 1946 (age 80)
- Education: University of Florida
- Known for: Developing one of the first laptop computers, the Gavilan SC
- Scientific career
- Fields: Computer Science
- Workplaces: Gartner; SI Ventures

Manuel "Manny" Fernandez (born April 22, 1946) is an American engineer and businessman.

Fernandez is known for being the founder of the Gavilan Computer Corporation. This company was a pioneer, developing one of the first truly portable laptop computers in 1983, the Gavilan SC. Fernandez would later go on to become the CEO of Gartner and the head of SI Ventures. Most recently, he was named executive chairman of Sysco Corporation.

Prior to founding SI Ventures, Manny was President, Chairman, and CEO (1991–2001) of Gartner, where he grew Gartner from $40 million in annual revenues to $900 million and market capitalization grew to over $4 billion, taking the company public in 1994. Manny continues to serve as Chairman Emeritus.

Prior to Gartner, Manny was President and CEO of three technology-driven companies, including Dataquest - an information services company, Gavilan Computer corporation - a laptop computer manufacturer, and Zilog Incorporated - a publicly traded micro-possessor company. At Zilog, he was responsible for growing annual revenue from $5 million to $120 million in only three years. Previously, Mr. Fernandez was also a Group Executive Vice President of Fairchild Semiconductor, where he managed roughly one-third of Fairchild's business at the time. He began his career in engineering positions with ITT and Harris Corporation. Manny holds a bachelor's degree in electrical engineering and post graduate in Solid State Physics from the University of Florida. Manny was also recognized as entrepreneur of the year in 1998.

Some of Manny's NYSE board seats include Stanley/Black & Decker, Sysco Corporation, Brunswick, and Flowers Foods. He has been recognized as one of the top 100 Directors by Directorship for his board leadership.

Manny has also served in President George W. Bush President's Information Technology Advisory Committee (PITAC). He was appointed to the University of Florida Board of Trustees in 2001, and from (2003–2007) he served as chairman of the board. While on the board he was successful at implementing a differential tuition program at the university.

== Education ==
- Bachelor's degree in Electrical Engineering from the University of Florida in 1967.

== Awards ==
- Fernandez was awarded the Gran Caiman of the year in 2007.
