= Gavilan SC =

Laptop computer

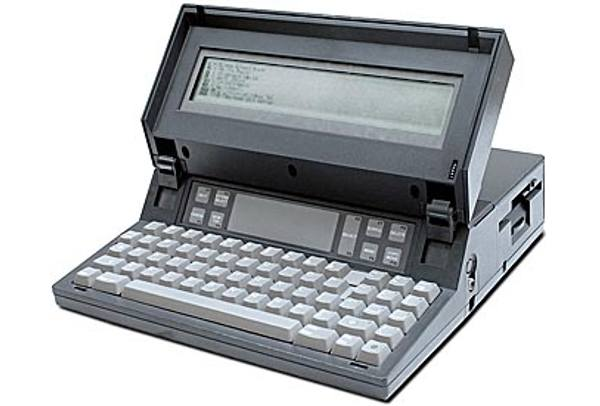
- Developer: Manuel "Manny" Fernandez
- Manufacturer: Gavilan Computer Corporation
- Released: April 1984; 42 years ago
- Introductory price: US$4,000 (equivalent to $12,900 in 2025)
- Discontinued: 1985
- Operating system: Gavilan Operating Environment (cancelled); MS-DOS
- CPU: 5 MHz Intel 8088
- Memory: 64 kilobytes static CMOS memory 48 KB ROM
- Storage: Floppy disk drive
- Display: LCD (400×64 pixels, 66 characters by 8 lines)
- Touchpad: Touchpad-like pointing device
- Connectivity: 300-baud modem
- Weight: 4 kg (8.8 lb)

The Gavilan SC is an early laptop computer first released by the Gavilan Computer Corporation in April 1984. The computer ran on an Intel 8088 microprocessor running at 5 MHz and sported a touchpad for a pointing device, one of the first computers to do so. The laptop was developed by Manuel "Manny" Fernandez, founder of the Gavilan Computer Corporation, and unveiled in May 1983.

== History ==
The brainchild of Manuel "Manny" Fernandez, the Gavilan was unveiled at COMDEX/Spring '83 at the Georgia World Congress Center in late April 1983. It was unveiled a year after the Grid Compass, with which it shared several pioneering details, notably a clamshell design, in which the screen folds shut over the keyboard.

The Gavilan, however, was more affordable than the Compass, at a list price of around US$4000. Unlike the Compass, it was equipped with a floppy disk drive and had a built-in battery. An internal 300-baud modem was standard. A compact printer that attached to the rear of the machine was an option.

The Gavilan was originally planned to ship with a proprietary, GUI-based operating system, called the Gavilan Operating Environment (GOE) and preinstalled with a suite of productivity applications, branded Capsuleware. GOE was to be stored in the laptop's 48 KB of ROM and would have used a FORTH-like interpreter to generate very compact code. Both GOE and Capsuleware failed to come to fruition, however, and by November 1983 the company announced that they had switched to providing the laptop with MS-DOS.

The machine's included software was a terminal program, MS-DOS, and MBasic (a version of the BASIC programming language). An Office Pack of four applications—Sorcim SuperCalc and SuperWriter, and pfs:File and pfs:Report—was optional.

It was far smaller than competing IBM compatible portables, such as the Compaq Portable, which were the size of a portable sewing machine and weighed more than twice the Gavilan's 4 kg (9 lb), and unlike the Gavilan they could not run off batteries. Gavilan claimed the SC could run up to nine hours on its built-in nickel-cadmium batteries.

Jack Hall, an award-winning industrial designer, was chosen to work out the ergonomics, mechanics and overall appearance of the Gavilan. An extremely compact printer module was the result of a collaboration between Hall Design and C. Itoh of Japan. Additionally, several patentable features such as the unique display hinge and printer attachment mechanism were embodied in the design.

The Gavilan sported an LCD with an unusual resolution of 400×64 pixels (representing 8 lines by 80 columns of text). It included a pioneering touchpad-like pointing device, installed on a panel above the keyboard. It used static CMOS memory, and came with 64 kilobytes standard. Memory was expandable through plug-in modules, for which there were four slots available (each 32 KB "CapsuleRam" module cost US$350 (equivalent to $1,130 in 2025) and included a backup battery); these slots could also be used for software ROM cartridges.

With standards for microfloppy drives still emerging, Gavilan was designed to accommodate both a 3.0-inch 320 KB microfloppy drive as well as a 3.5-inch floppy drive.

Gavilan originally planned to avoid the retail segment entirely, instead providing the laptop through corporate fleet sellers. In November 1983, however, the company pivoted to providing the laptop to individuals through retail outlets. Owing to a rigorous overhaul of the design of the laptop, the company missed its initial shipment deadline of December 1983, with the first several dozen units shipping instead in April 1984. Early units were fraught with technical issues, prompting more tweaks. Mass production and sales did not commence until June 1984. By this point, a major distributor of the Gavilan computer had filed for bankruptcy and was forced to pulled out of their deal with Gavilan. In late 1984, Gavilan Computer Corporation themselves declared Chapter 11 bankruptcy with cash flow problems. The company ceased operations in 1985, having only shipped a few thousand units of the Gavilan SC.

== Reception ==
BYTE in June 1983 called the Gavilan "a traveling professional's dream come true ... [it] promises to set new industry standards, not only for truly portable computers, but also for integration of applications software".
