= VLSI Technology =

Former American semiconductor company

VLSI Technology, Inc.
- Industry: Electronics
- Founded: 1979; 47 years ago
- Founders: Jack Balletto; Dan Floyd; Gunnar Wetlesen; Doug Fairbairn
- Defunct: June 1999
- Fate: Acquired by Philips Electronics
- Successor: NXP Semiconductors
- Headquarters: San Jose, California, United States
- Website: vlsi.com at the Wayback Machine (archived 1997-05-04)

VLSI Technology, Inc., was an American company that designed and manufactured custom and semi-custom integrated circuits (ICs). The company was based in Silicon Valley, with headquarters at 1109 McKay Drive in San Jose. Along with LSI Logic, VLSI Technology defined the leading edge of the application-specific integrated circuit (ASIC) business, which accelerated the push of powerful embedded systems into affordable products.

Initially the company often referred to itself as "VTI" (for VLSI Technology Inc.), and adopted a distinctive "VTI" logo. But it was forced to drop that designation in the mid-1980s because of a trademark conflict.

VLSI was acquired in June 1999, for about $1 billion, by Philips Electronics and is today a part of the Philips spin-off NXP Semiconductors.

== History ==
The company was founded in 1979 by a trio from Fairchild Semiconductor by way of Synertek—Jack Balletto, Dan Floyd, and Gunnar Wetlesen—and by Doug Fairbairn of Xerox PARC and Lambda (later VLSI Design) magazine.

Alfred J. Stein became the CEO of the company in 1982. Subsequently, VLSI built its first fab in San Jose; eventually a second fab was built in San Antonio, Texas. VLSI had its initial public offering on February 23, 1983, in which 4,000,000 shares were sold at $13 a share. It was listed on the stock market as (Nasdaq: VLSI). The company was acquired in 1999 by Philips for $21 a share, and survives to this day as part of NXP Semiconductors.

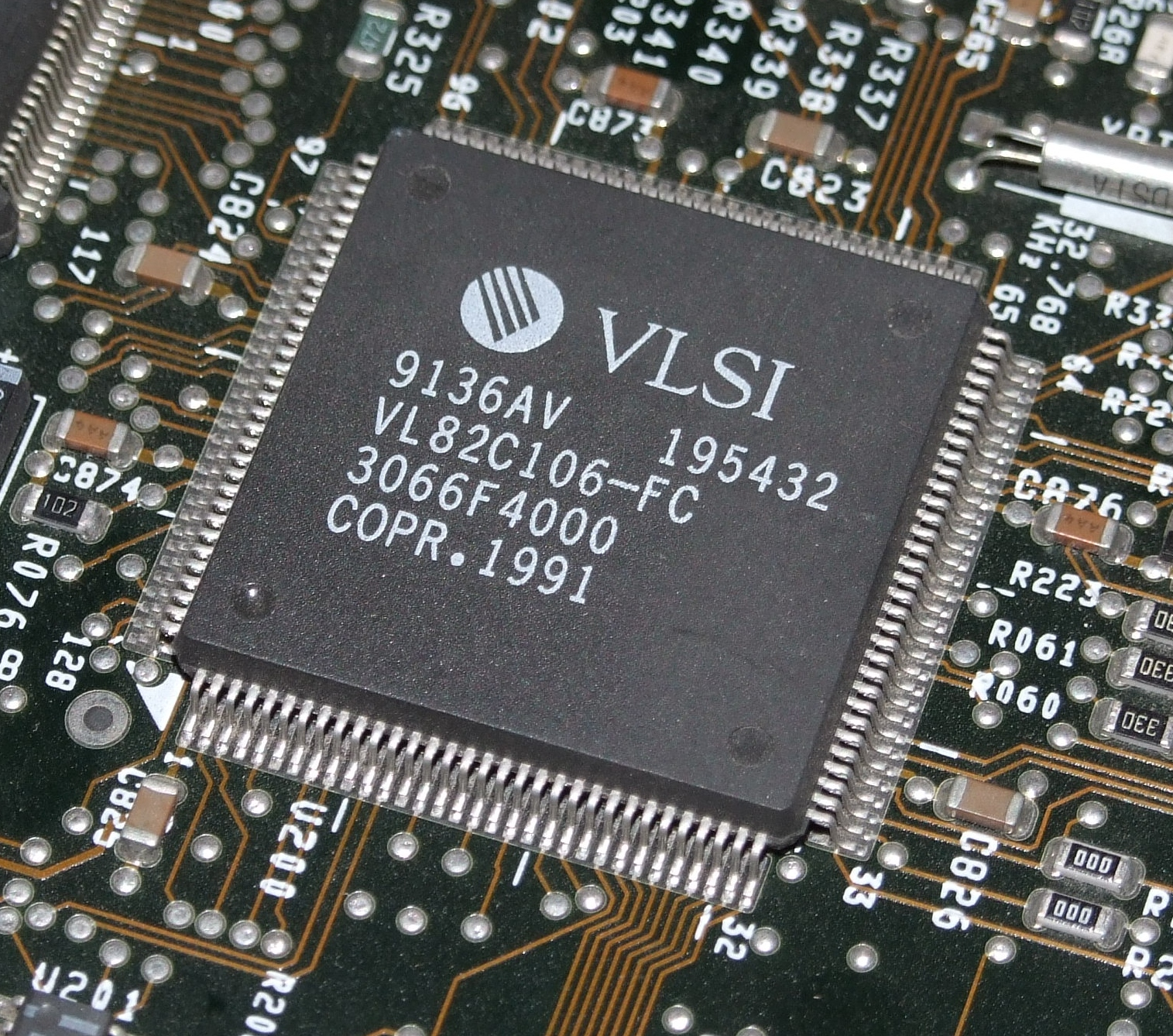
A VLSI VL82C106 Super I/O chip

The original business plan was to be a contract wafer fabrication company, but the venture investors wanted the company to develop IC (Integrated Circuit) design tools to help fill the foundry.

Thanks to its Caltech and UC Berkeley students, VLSI was an important pioneer in the electronic design automation (EDA) industry. It offered a sophisticated package of tools, originally based on the 'lambda-based' design style advocated by Carver Mead and Lynn Conway.

An early challenge for the fledgling company was the so-called Bagpipe project. In January 1982, Steve Jobs approached a group of VLSI Technology managers including Jack Balletto, with a request: Would they help Apple Inc. build a custom chip for the not-yet-announced Macintosh computer? In spite of the fact that VLSI's design tools were still in their infancy, the offer proved irresistible because of the prestige the chip would confer on the company if successful. For the VLSI technology engineering team, this project became an all-hands-on-deck effort. Working side by side with Apple engineers Burrell Smith and Martin Haeberli, the group delivered a packaged prototype by September. Although the chip (referred to as the Integrated Burrell Machine) was functional, its performance fell short of expectations, and schedule pressures caused Apple to drop the chip in favor of a more conservative design – a big disappointment for VLSI Technology.

VLSI became an early vendor of standard cell (cell-based technology) to the merchant market in the early 1980s, where the other ASIC-focused company, LSI Logic, was a leader in gate arrays. Prior to VLSI's cell-based offering, the technology had been primarily available only within large vertically integrated companies with semiconductor units such as AT&T and IBM.

VLSI's design tools included not only design entry and simulation but eventually also cell-based routing (chip compiler), a datapath compiler, SRAM and ROM compilers, and a state machine compiler. The tools were an integrated design solution for IC design and not just point tools, or more general purpose system tools. A designer could edit transistor-level polygons and/or logic schematics, then run DRC and LVS, extract parasitics from the layout and run Spice simulation, then back-annotate the timing or gate size changes into the logic schematic database. Characterization tools were integrated to generate FrameMaker Data Sheets for Libraries.

In March 1991, VLSI spun off its IC design tools group into a wholly owned subsidiary, Compass Design Automation. The Compass subsidiary was purchased by Avanti Corporation in 1997.

VLSI's physical design tools were critical not only to its ASIC business, but also acted as significant drivers for the broader electronic design automation (EDA) industry. When VLSI and its main ASIC competitor, LSI Logic, were establishing the ASIC industry, commercially available tools could not deliver the productivity necessary to support the physical design of hundreds of ASIC designs each year without the deployment of a substantial number of layout engineers. The companies' development of automated layout tools was driven by a judgement that other in-market products were not sufficient or adaptable enough for VLSI's use case. Other significant market entrants with similar capabilities arrived in late 1980s when Tangent Systems released its TanCell and TanGate products. In 1989, Tangent was acquired by Cadence Design Systems (founded in 1988).

By the early 1990s, VLSI had not been timely in adopting a 1.0 μm manufacturing process as the rest of the industry moved to that geometry in the late 1980s. VLSI entered a long-term technology partnership with Hitachi and finally released a 1.0 μm process and cell library (actually more of a 1.2 μm library with a 1.0 μm gate).

As VLSI struggled to gain parity with the rest of the industry in semiconductor technology, the design flow was moving rapidly to a Verilog HDL and synthesis flow. Cadence acquired Gateway, the leader in Verilog hardware design language (HDL) and Synopsys was dominating the exploding field of design synthesis. As VLSI's tools were being eclipsed, VLSI waited too long to open the tools up to other fabs and Compass Design Automation was never a viable competitor to industry leaders.

Meanwhile, VLSI entered the merchant high speed static RAM (SRAM) market as they needed a product to drive the semiconductor process technology development. All the large semiconductor companies built high speed SRAMs with cost structures VLSI could never match. VLSI withdrew once it was clear that the Hitachi process technology partnership was working.

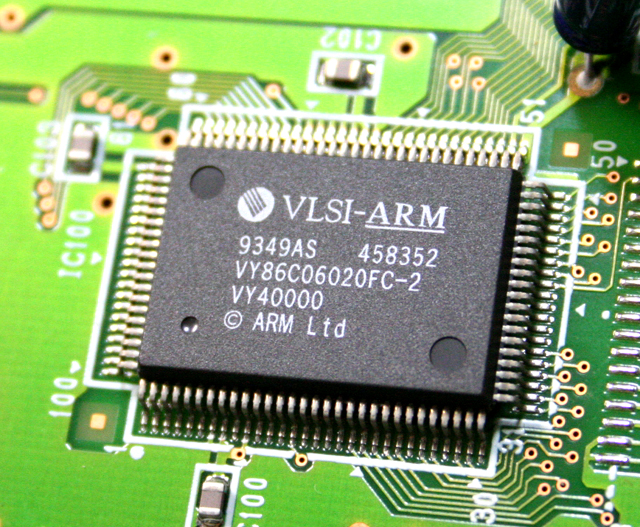
VLSI VY86C06020FC-2 ARM60 CPU chip

ARM Ltd was formed in 1990 as a semiconductor intellectual property licensor, backed by Acorn, Apple, and VLSI. VLSI became a licensee of the powerful ARM processor. Initial adoption of the ARM processor was slow. Few applications could justify the overhead of an embedded 32-bit processor. In fact, despite the addition of further licensees, the ARM processor enjoyed little market success until they developed the novel 'Thumb' extensions. Ericsson adopted the ARM processor in a VLSI chipset for its GSM handset designs in the early 1990s. It was the GSM boost that is the foundation of ARM the company/technology that it is today.

In the early 1990s, VLSI produced a first-party PC chipset. This product was developed by five engineers using the "Megacells" in the VLSI library. In time, this business developed into a significant revenue stream. The chipsets designed and manufactured by VLSI integrated much of the peripheral I/O logic and thereby substantially lowered the cost of PCs that used Intel or Motorola processors. This included the early Apple Power Macintosh PCs which used the Motorola 68030 and 68040. Some innovations included the integration of PCI bridge logic and the GraphiCore 2D graphics accelerator.

The GraphiCore project was formed and led by Desi Rhoden in 1994. It was notable for being a fresh design, without the baggage of legacy EGA/VGA logic, and for direct support of synchronous DRAM, the forerunner of DDR memory. Desi Rhoden later founded AMI, a consortium of all the major DRAM vendors, which created important standards in DDR memory design. VLSI eventually ceded the chipset market to Intel because Intel was able to package-sell its processors, chipsets, and even board-level products together.

VLSI also had an early partnership with PMC, a design group that had been nurtured of British Columbia Bell. When PMC wanted to divest its semiconductor intellectual property venture, VLSI's bid was beaten by a creative deal by Sierra Semiconductor. The telecom business unit management at VLSI opted to go it alone. PMC Sierra became one of the most important telecom ASSP vendors.

Scientists and innovations from the 'design technology' part of VLSI found their way to Cadence Design Systems (by way of Redwood Design Automation). Compass Design Automation (VLSI's CAD and Library spin-off) was sold to Avant! Corporation, which itself was acquired by Synopsys.

== Global expansion, ARM, GSM and Philips/NXP ==
VLSI maintained operations throughout the US, and in Britain, France, Germany, Italy, Japan, Singapore and Taiwan. One of its key sites was in Tempe, Arizona, where a family of highly successful chipsets was developed for IBM PC compatible motherboards and early Apple Power Macintosh PCs.

VLSI's design office in Richardson, Texas, was responsible for the design of many large, standard cell ASICS in the 1990s, including the first floating-point co-processors for Cyrix and Digital signal processors for telecom switching and echo-cancellation equipment for Alcatel-Lucent.

In 1990, VLSI Technology, Acorn Computers, and Apple Computer were the founding investing partners in ARM Ltd. VLSI Technology was the only manufacturer of chips using ARM cores at that time, as well as the only designer of ASICs using ARM.

In 1997, VLSI Technology offered the first ARM chipset for Set-top box vendors for the cable and satellite TV industries named VISTA (VLSI Integrated Set-Top Architecture). Previously, STB chipsets were custom designed for single customers only and were not available to the emerging merchant market. But, VISTA was a merchant market, 4-chip set that featured an ARM7TDMI processor core, transport and demux and a Mediamatics MPEG 1/2 decoder with On Screen Display logic.

Ericsson of Sweden, after many years of collaboration, was by 1998 VLSI's largest customer, with annual revenue of $120 million. VLSI's datapath compiler (VDP) was the value-added differentiator that opened the door at Ericsson in 1987–1988. The silicon revenue and GPM enabled by VDP must make it one of the most successful pieces of customer-configurable, non-memory silicon intellectual property (SIP) in the history of the industry. Within the Wireless Products division, based at Sophia-Antipolis in France, VLSI developed a range of algorithms and circuits for the GSM standard and for cordless standards such as the European DECT and the Japanese PHS.

Stimulated by its growth and success in the wireless handset IC area, Philips Electronics acquired VLSI in June 1999, for about $1 billion. The former components survive to this day as part of Philips spin-off NXP Semiconductors.

== Products ==
VLSI Technology produced highly integrated PC/AT chipset and support IC families used in 80286/80386/80486-era IBM PC compatible systems, including ISA and Micro Channel designs.

=== PC/AT-compatible chipset families ===
- TOPCAT 286/386SX (VL82C286-SET) – a high-integration chipset for 80286 and 80386SX PC/AT-compatible systems (with associated support parts such as the VL82C106 combination I/O).
- TOPCAT 386DX (VL82C386-SET) – a high-integration chipset for 80386DX PC/AT-compatible systems.
- SCAMP controllers (VL82C310 / VL82C311 / VL82C311L) – system controller chips positioned as cost-effective mid-range solutions for notebooks/portables and cached desktop PC/AT compatibles; VLSI documentation describes their intended use across 80286 and 80386SX platforms, and includes technical reference manuals for the devices.

=== ARM-based products ===
- VLSI Technology was one of the founding partners of ARM Ltd in 1990, alongside Acorn Computers and Apple Computer, and was the first manufacturer to produce chips using ARM processor cores.
- For Ericsson's GSM handset designs in the early 1990s, VLSI produced ARM processor-based chipsets.
- In 1997, VLSI introduced the VISTA (VLSI Integrated Set-Top Architecture) chipset for set-top box vendors, featuring an ARM7TDMI processor core, transport and demultiplexer logic, and an MPEG 1/2 decoder.

=== Micro Channel (PS/2) chipsets ===
- VL82C700 / VL82C701 – a two-chip Micro Channel chipset for 20 MHz 80386SX systems, described by VLSI as a PS/2 Model 57 compatible design with extensive on-chip I/O control functions.

== See also ==
- Design rule checking
- Electronic design automation (EDA)
- Semiconductor device
- Very-large-scale integration
- Power Macintosh
- DDR3 SDRAM
- Set-top box
- Alcatel-Lucent
