= Michael A. Keller =

American academician and librarian (born 1945)

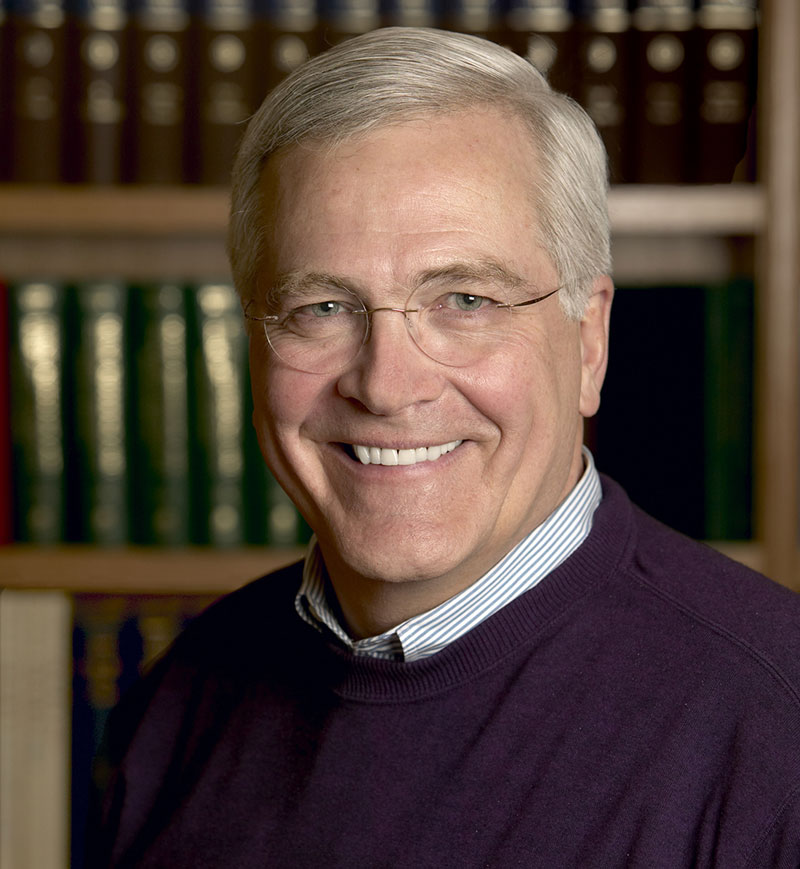
- Born: April 5, 1945 (age 81); Sterling, Colorado, United States
- Title: Ida M. Green University Librarian Stanford University Libraries
- Awards: Elected Fellow, American Association for the Advancement of Science (2009-Present); Elected Fellow, American Academy of Arts and Sciences (2010-Present)

Academic background
- Education: Hamilton College; State University of New York

Academic work
- Institutions: Stanford University
- Website: https://library.stanford.edu/people/makeller

Michael Alan Keller (born April 5, 1945) is an American academician and librarian. He holds an appointment at Stanford University as the Ida M. Green University Librarian (1994 to the present) and, until August 31, 2020, Vice Provost for Teaching and Learning (2018-2020).

Keller received the Kenneth M. Cuthbertson Award for Exceptional Service to Stanford University (2015). The award commended him "for pioneering new paths as the director of Academic Information Resources, while continuing to develop the libraries' superb collections," and "for his clear commitment to scholarly publishing, exemplified in his founding of HighWire Press and ongoing support of Stanford University Press."

Keller was appointed Senior Presidential Fellow of the Council on Library and Information Resources (CLIR) (2007) and served on the CLIR Board (2017-2022. He is an elected lifetime Fellow of both the American Association for the Advancement of Science (2009), “for extensive and innovative contributions to the dissemination, preservation and advancement of scientific and other scholarly literature through electronic and other means,” and the American Academy of Arts and Sciences (2010), which said that Keller “champions emerging information technologies while nurturing traditional library collections” and that his “impact extends beyond Stanford through many visionary lectures on how to organize research libraries for the digital era.”

== Early life ==
Michael Keller was raised in New York State as one of four children. His father was a public school principal and superintendent, and his mother was a homemaker and teacher. He began his musical career as a chorister at the Church of the Advent in Westbury, New York.

Keller earned his B.A. in Biology and Music from Hamilton College, New York (1967), his M.A. in Music History from University at Buffalo (1970), and his M.L.S. in Academic Librarianship from State University of New York at Geneseo (1972). His dissertation topic at the State University of New York at Buffalo (degree not completed) was “Brescian origins of the Late Renaissance canzona.”

== Career ==
Keller began his academic career at the Music Library, State University of New York at Buffalo as Assistant Librarian for Reference and Cataloging from 1970 to 1973. From 1973 to 1981, he was Music Librarian and Senior Lecturer in Musicology at Cornell University, where he was also Acting Undergraduate Librarian in 1976. From 1981 to 1986, he was Head of the Music Library, University of California at Berkeley. In 1984, he was also a Visiting Lecturer in the Department of Music, Stanford University. From 1986 to 1993, he was Associate University Librarian and Director of Collection Development at Yale University.

Keller became a Director at Stanford Libraries in 1993. In 1994, he was named the Ida M. Green University Librarian and Director of Academic Information Resources. From 1995 to 2014, he also served as Founder and Publisher for HighWire Press, and beginning in 2001, as Publisher for Stanford University Press.

Keller has served on more than sixty-five boards, advisory committees, and professional organizations. He is formerly Chairman, International Image Interoperability Framework Consortium Executive Committee (2015 to 2022); Member, Board of Directors, Council on Library and Information Resources (2013 to the present); Member, Board of Trustees, Kistler-Ritso Foundation (United States and Estonia) (2010 to the present); and Emeritus Member of the Board of Directors, The Long Now Foundation.

At the National Academies of Sciences, Engineering, and Medicine Keller was an appointed member on the Steering Committee for the Initiative on the Informed Brain in the Digital World (2011-2014), the Committee to Develop a Research Agenda on Copyright & Innovation, Science (2010-2011), the Committee on Scientific Responsibility (2009-2016), and the Board on Research Data and Information (2009-2011). He was Founding Member, President, and Chairman of the National Digital Library Federation (1994-2007).

At Stanford, Keller served as a University Fellow (1994-1995) and on the Academic Senate ex-officio (1993-2010), Commission on Technology in Teaching and Learning (1994-1998), and President's Cabinet (1994 to the present). He was an Alumni Trustee at Hamilton College (2001-2005) and a member of the Consultative Board at the British Library (2009-2011).

Keller’s honors and awards include Elected Fellow, American Association for the Advancement of Science (2009 to the present); Elected Fellow, American Academy of Arts and Sciences (2010 to the present); Minerva Award, SUNY/Geneseo (2011); Sarum Canon, Salisbury Cathedral, Wiltshire, United Kingdom (2014 to the present); Kenneth M. Cuthbertson Award for Exceptional Service to Stanford University (2015); Order of the Cross of Terra Mariana, Fourth Class, Estonia (2016); and Honorary Fellow for Life, Harris Manchester College at Oxford University (2019).

== Research ==
Under Keller’s leadership, Stanford Libraries has developed robust digital systems and services that effectively deploy information technology together with research resources and advanced scholarly communications. Keller has co-founded several technology-based initiatives while serving as University Librarian at Stanford, including LOCKSS, The International Image Interoperability Framework (IIIF) Consortium, and HighWire Press. He lectures in the United States and abroad on the future of libraries, advocating for the digital sharing of information resources around the world.

== Selected publications ==
- “Exploiting the opportunities of the maturing digital age: the first twenty years of the

Scholarly Communications Program of the Andrew W. Mellon Foundation,” April 2019 PDF

- “Mountain View: the Agreement among Google, Publishers, and Authors,” 2009 Link
- “Scattered Leaves: Reflections on Leadership,” by Michael A. Keller, 2003 Link
- All Publications by Michael A. Keller
