= Electronics (magazine) =

American trade journal (1930-1995)

- Categories: Trade journal
- First issue: April 1930
- Final issue: 1995
- Company: McGraw-Hill Education: until 1988; Verenigde Nederlandse Uitgeverijen: 1988-1989; Penton Media: 1989-1995
- Country: United States
- Language: English
- ISSN: 0013-5070

Electronics is a discontinued American trade journal that covers the radio industry and subsequent industries from 1930 to 1995. Its first issue is dated April 1930. The periodical was published with the title Electronics until 1984, when it was changed temporarily to ElectronicsWeek, but was then reverted to the original title Electronics in 1985. The ISSN for the corresponding periods are: ISSN 0013-5070 for the 1930–1984 issues, ISSN 0748-3252 for the 1984–1985 issues with title ElectronicsWeek, and ISSN 0883-4989 for the 1985–1995 issues. It was published by McGraw-Hill until 1988, when it was sold to the Dutch company VNU. VNU sold its American electronics magazines to Penton Publishing the next year.

Generally a bimonthly magazine, its frequency and page count varied with the state of the industry, until its end in 1995. More than its principal rival Electronic News, it balanced its appeal to managerial and technical interests (at the time of its 1992 makeover, it described itself as a magazine for managers). The magazine is best known for publishing the April 19, 1965 article by Intel co-founder Gordon Moore, in which he outlined what came to be known as Moore's Law.

== Intel's hunt for Moore's original article ==
On April 11, 2005, Intel posted a US$10,000 reward for an original, pristine copy of the Electronics Magazine where Moore's article was first published. The hunt was started in part because Moore lost his personal copy after loaning it out. Intel asked a favor of Silicon Valley neighbor and auction website eBay, having a notice posted on the website. Intel's spokesman explained, "We're kind of hopeful that it will start a bit of a scavenger hunt for the engineering community of Silicon Valley, and hopefully somebody has it tucked away in a box in the corner of their garage. We think it's an important piece of history, and we'd love to have an original copy."

It soon became apparent to librarians that their copies of the article were in danger of being stolen, so many libraries (including Duke University and the University of North Carolina at Chapel Hill) located and secured the articles. The University of Illinois at Urbana-Champaign was not so lucky, however, as the day after Intel announced the reward, they found that one of the two copies they owned was missing. Intel has stated that they will only purchase library copies of the article from the libraries themselves, and that it would be easy to determine as most libraries bind their old magazines, requiring the cutting of the article from the bound book if a thief were to sell the article.

Intel ultimately awarded the prize to David Clark, an engineer living in Surrey, England who had decades of old issues of Electronics stored under his floorboards.

== First use of E-mail as an abbreviation ==
The Oxford English Dictionary (OED) cites the first usage of the abbreviation E-mail in the June 1979 edition of Electronics: “Postal Service pushes ahead with E-mail”. The headline was in reference to the United States Postal Service initiative called E-COM, which was developed in the late 1970s and operated in the early 1980s. No earlier usage has been found, and the first usage of the term email may be irretrievably lost.

CompuServe rebranded its electronic mail service as EMAIL in April 1981, which popularized the term.
