= Flow to HDL =

Tools and methods convert flow-based system design into a hardware description language

Flow to HDL tools and methods convert flow-based system design into a hardware description language (HDL) such as VHDL or Verilog. Typically this is a method of creating designs for field-programmable gate array, application-specific integrated circuit prototyping and digital signal processing (DSP) design. Flow-based system design is well-suited to field-programmable gate array design as it is easier to specify the innate parallelism of the architecture.

== History ==
The use of flow-based design tools in engineering is a reasonably new trend. Unified Modeling Language is the most widely used example for software design. The use of flow-based design tools allows for more holistic system design and faster development. C to HDL tools and flow have a similar aim, but with C or C-like programming languages.

== Applications ==
Most applications are ones which take too long with existing supercomputer architectures. These include bioinformatics, CFD, financial processing and oil and gas survey data analysis. Embedded applications that require high performance or real-time data processing are also an area of use. System-on-a-chip design can also be done using this flow.

== Examples ==
- Xilinx System Generator from Xilinx
- StarBridge VIVA from defunct
- Nimbus from defunct ~~Exsedia~~

== See also ==
- Application Specific Integrated Circuit (ASIC)
- C to HDL
- Comparison of Free EDA software
- Comparison of EDA Software
- Complex programmable logic device (CPLD)
- ELLA (programming language)
- Electronic design automation (EDA)
- Embedded C++
- Field Programmable Gate Array (FPGA)
- Hardware description language (HDL)
- Handel-C
- Icarus Verilog
- Lustre (programming language)
- MyHDL
- Open source software
- Register transfer notation
- Register transfer level (RTL)
- Ruby (hardware description language)
- SpecC
- SystemC
- SystemVerilog
- Systemverilog DPI
- VHDL
- VHDL-AMS
- Verilog
- Verilog-A
- Verilog-AMS
