= RTN =

RTN may refer to:

- Racetrack Television Network, North America
- Random telegraph noise
- Recursive transition network
- Register transfer notation for synchronous digital circuits
- Reticular thalamic nucleus
- Retro Television Network, US
- Routing Transit Number in US banking system
- Rowan Television Network
- Royal Thai Navy
- Former callsign of the NRN TV station in Lismore, NSW, Australia
- RTN (Switzerland), radio broadcaster
- Russian Television Network of America
