= Mitrione =

Mitrione is a surname. Notable people with the surname include:

- Dan Mitrione (1920–1970), American diplomat
- Matt Mitrione (born 1978), American mixed martial artist and footballer

== See also ==
- Mitrionics, Swedish company
