= HBJ =

HBJ may refer to:

- HVJ Gas Pipeline, also known as HBJ Gas Pipeline, in India
- Habibganj railway station, in Bhopal, India
- Halmstad Bolmen Railway (Swedish: Halmstad–Bolmens Järnväg), a defunct Swedish railway
- Hamad bin Jassim bin Jaber Al Thani, former prime minister and foreign minister of Qatar
- Harcourt Brace Jovanovich, a defunct American publisher
- HBJ model, message-passing in parallel computing
