= SA-C (programming language) =

Single Assignment C (SA-C) (pronounced "sassy") is a member of the C programming language family designed to be directly and intuitively translatable into circuits, including FPGAs. To ease translation, SA-C does not include pointers and arithmetics thereon. To retain most of the expressiveness of C, SA-C instead features true n-dimensional arrays as first-class objects of the language.

== See also ==
- Mitrionics
