= PipeRench =

Project from Carnegie Mellon University

The PipeRench Reconfigurable Computing Project is a project from the Carnegie Mellon University intended to improve reconfigurable computing systems. It aims to allow hardware virtualization through high-speed reconfiguration, in order to minimize resource constraints in FPGAs and similar systems.

The project has already succeeded in manufacturing a chip and testing it. PipeRench has been licensed by a start-up—Rapport and is the basis of their Kilocore chip.
