= Nick Tredennick =

American inventor (1946–2022)

Harry L. Tredennick III
- Born: August 8, 1946; Schenectady, New York (state), USA
- Died: July 26, 2022 (aged 75); Los Gatos, California, USA
- Education: Texas Tech University; University of Texas
- Engineering career
- Discipline: microcode
- Employer: Motorola IBM NexGen Altera
- Significant design: MC68000 IBM Micro/370
- Awards: IEEE Fellow

Harry L. "Nick" Tredennick was an American manager, inventor, VLSI design engineer and author who was involved in the development for Motorola's MC68000 and for IBM's Micro/370 microprocessors. He held BSEE and MSEE degrees from Texas Tech University, and a Ph.D. in Electrical Engineering from the University of Texas at Austin. Tredennick was named a Fellow of the IEEE; the citation reads "For the design and implementation of the execution unit and controller of the MC68000 workstation microprocessor".

He died July 26, 2022, in an All-terrain vehicle accident.

== Career ==
- From 1977 to 1979, he was a Senior Design Engineer at Motorola, where he specified and designed the microcode and the controller core of the MC68000 microprocessor, one of the first microprocessors designed by structured VLSI design.
- From 1979 to 1987, Tredennick worked on microcode and logic design for the IBM Micro/370 microprocessor at the Thomas J. Watson Research Center. While at IBM, in 1983/1984 he took sabbatical leave to teach computer organization, chip design, and the Flowchart Method at UC Berkeley.
- In 1986, Tredennick co-founded NexGen and was director of product development there in 1987-1988. NexGen later developed the Nx686 microprocessor which became the AMD K6 when the company was acquired by AMD in 1996.
- As Chief Scientist of Altera Corporation from 1993 to 1995 he began advocating Reconfigurable Computing as an essential paradigm shift in computer science, a topic he spoke and published on extensively.
- In 1988 he started Tredennick, Inc. to analyze microprocessor industry trends and provide consulting on VLSI CPU design and reconfigurable computing.

Tredennick was an advisor and investor in numerous pre-IPO startups and a member of technical advisory boards for numerous companies. In 2007 he joined the board of Patriot Scientific.

In parallel to his professional career, Tredennick served as a pilot with the U.S. Air Force (active, reserve, and National Guard) from 1970–1984, attaining the rank of major, as Aerospace Engineering Duty Officer in the U.S. Naval Reserve from 1986-2000 at the rank of captain, and on the Army Science Board from 1994–2001 and from 2006.

== Publications ==
Tredennick wrote several books and numerous articles in professional and trade magazines; inter alia, as a Contributing Editor of Microprocessor Report, and on the Editorial Advisory Boards for Microprocessors and Microsystems, for Embedded Developer's Journal, and IEEE Spectrum, as well as editing the Gilder Technology Report on leading-edge components. He has often appeared as panelist and keynote speaker on international conferences.

Tredennick held nine U.S. patents on subjects ranging from microprocessors to reconfigurable computing.

== Selected publications ==
- Microprocessor Logic Design: The Flowchart Method.
- Microprocessor-based Computers.
- Implementation Decisions for the MC68000 Microprocessor.
- The Case for Reconfigurable Computing.

== Sources ==
- ACM profile
