= AHPL =

A Hardware Programming Language (AHPL) is software developed at University of Arizona that has been used as a tool for teaching computer organization.

It was initially started as a set of notations for representation of computer hardware for academics, which is later started to be considered as a Hardware Description Language on development of compiler and simulator for it. This language describes a hardware functionality as flow of data between the ports or sub-modules.

The notation, syntax, and semantics were based on the APL programming language.
