= ILAND project =

Embedded systems middleware

The iLAND project (middleware for deterministic dynamically reconfigurable networked embedded systems) is a cross-industry research & development project for advanced research in embedded systems. It has been developed with the collaboration of 9 organisations including Industries, SMEs and Universities from Spain, France, Portugal, Netherlands and a university from United States. The project is co-funded by the ARTEMIS Programme related to the topic: 'SP5 Computing Environments for Embedded Systems'.

== Middleware functionalities ==
The merging of the real-time systems and the service-oriented architectures enables more flexible a dynamic distributed systems with real time features. So a number of functionalities have been identified to create a SoA based middleware for deterministic reconfiguration of service-based applications:

- Service registration/deregistration: Stores in the system the functionalities and the description of the different services.
- Service discovery: Enables external actor to discover the services currently stored in the system.
- Service composition: Creates the service-based application on run-time.
- Service orchestration: Manages the invocation of the different services.
- Service based admission test: This functionality checks if there are enough resources for the services execution in the distributed system.
- Resource reservation: This functionality acquires the necessary resources in the host machine and the network.
- System monitoring: This functionality measures if the resources required for the execution of services are not being exhausted.
- System reconfiguration: This functionality changes the services currently running on the system by other services providing same functionality.

== Middleware architecture ==
The architecture of the iLAND middleware consists in two layers. The high level one is the Core Functionality Layer. It is oriented to the management of the real time service model. The low layer creates bridges to the system resources and the network resources in order to provide the real time operation. Each of these layers contain different software components

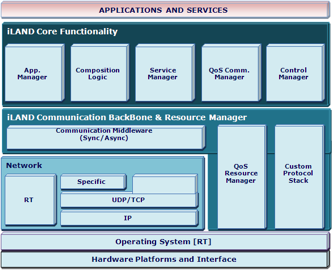
iLAND middleware architecture

The middleware architecture is further explained in where the reconfiguration mechanism of the middleware is also explained.

== Demonstrators ==
Different demonstrators have been developed in the iLAND project. They cover different domains:

- Wireless Applications for Public Transportation
- Video Surveillance
- Health Care Applications
