= RTN (Switzerland) =

Swiss radio station

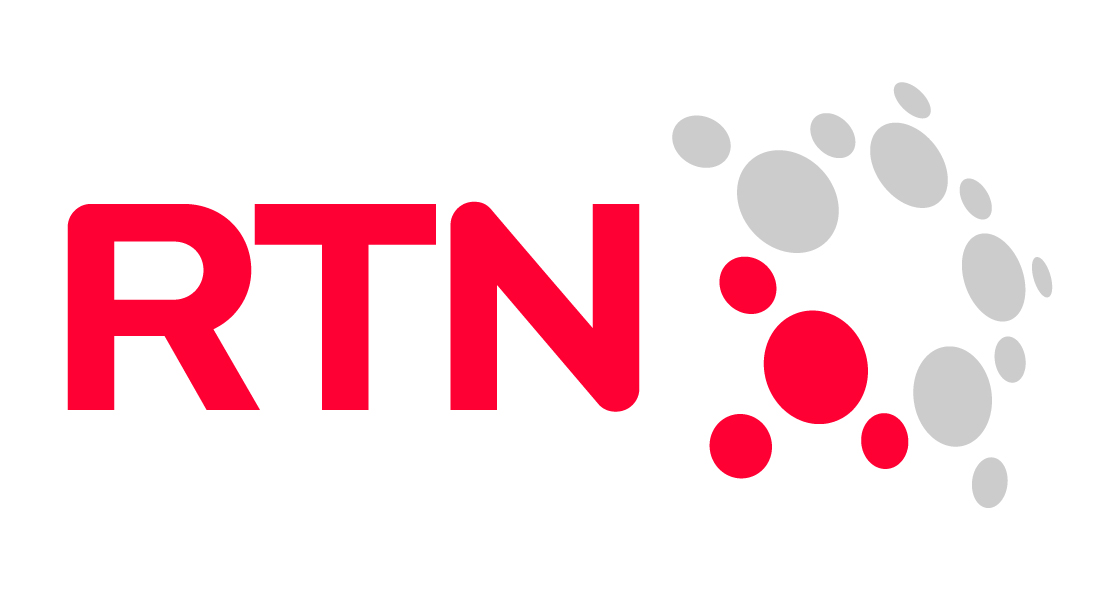
- Marin-Epagnier; Switzerland

Programming
- Language: French

Links
- Website: www.rtn.ch

RTN is a private, Frenchspeaking Swiss radio station. It is a public service broadcaster with a focus on local news and information. Founded in 1984, it broadcasts on FM in the canton of Neuchâtel, the north of the canton of Vaud and part of the Broye region. Since 2014, it has also been broadcasting on DAB+ throughout French-speaking Switzerland. Its studios are located in Marin, in the canton of Neuchâtel.

Until 2024, it belonged to the group owned by Pierre Steulet, director of BNJ FM, which also included RFJ, RJB and BNJ Suisse SA (GRRIF). In 2025, RTN was again granted with the concession for the Neuchâtel region for the next 10 years, delivered by the Federal Office of Communications.

RTN has around sixty employees (40 full-time positions).
