= MyHDL =

MyHDL is a Python-based hardware description language (HDL).

Features of MyHDL include:

- The ability to generate VHDL and Verilog code from a MyHDL design.
- The ability to generate a testbench (Conversion of test benches) with test vectors in VHDL or Verilog, based on complex computations in Python.
- The ability to convert a list of signals.
- The ability to convert output verification.
- The ability to do co-simulation with Verilog.
- An advanced datatype system, independent of traditional datatypes. MyHDL's translator tool automatically writes conversion functions when the target language requires them.

MyHDL is developed by Jan Decaluwe.

== Conversion examples ==
Here, you can see some examples of conversions from MyHDL designs to VHDL and/or Verilog.

A small combinatorial design

The example is a small combinatorial design, more specifically the binary to Gray code converter:

def bin2gray(B, G, width: int):
    """Gray encoder.

    B -- input intbv signal, binary encoded
    G -- output intbv signal, gray encoded
    width -- bit width
    """

    @always_comb
    def logic():
        Bext = intbv(0)[width + 1 :]
        Bext[:] = B
        for i in range(width):
            G.next[i] = Bext[i + 1] ^ Bext[i]

    return logic

You can create an instance and convert to Verilog and VHDL as follows:

width = 8

B = Signal(intbv(0)[width:])
G = Signal(intbv(0)[width:])

bin2gray_inst = toVerilog(bin2gray, B, G, width)
bin2gray_inst = toVHDL(bin2gray, B, G, width)

The generated Verilog code looks as follows:

module bin2gray (
    B,
    G
);

input [7:0] B;
output [7:0] G;
reg [7:0] G;

always @(B) begin: BIN2GRAY_LOGIC
    integer i;
    reg [9-1:0] Bext;
    Bext = 9'h0;
    Bext = B;
    for (i=0; i<8; i=i+1) begin
        G[i] <= (Bext[(i + 1)] ^ Bext[i]);
    end
end

endmodule

The generated VHDL code looks as follows:

library IEEE;
use IEEE.std_logic_1164.all;
use IEEE.numeric_std.all;
use std.textio.all;

use work.pck_myhdl_06.all;

entity bin2gray is
    port (
        B: in unsigned(7 downto 0);
        G: out unsigned(7 downto 0)
    );
end entity bin2gray;

architecture MyHDL of bin2gray is

begin

BIN2GRAY_LOGIC: process (B) is
    variable Bext: unsigned(8 downto 0);
begin
    Bext := to_unsigned(0, 9);
    Bext := resize(B, 9);
    for i in 0 to 8-1 loop
        G(i) <= (Bext((i + 1)) xor Bext(i));
    end loop;
end process BIN2GRAY_LOGIC;

end architecture MyHDL;

== See also ==
- Comparison of Free EDA software
- Comparison of EDA Software
- Electronic design automation (EDA)
- C to HDL compilers
- List of free and open-source EDA software
