= HBJ model =

Message-passing model of parallel computing

In computer science, the Helman-Bader-JaJa model is a concise message-passing model of parallel computing defined with the following parameters:

- $p$ is number of processors.
- $n$ is the problem size.
- $m$ is number of machine words in a packet sent over the network.
- $\tau$ is the latency, or time at which a processor takes to initiate a communication on a network.
- $\sigma$ is the bandwidth, or time per machine word at which a processor can inject or receive $m$ machine words from the network.
- $T_{comp}$ is the largest computation time expended on a processor.
- $T_{comm}$ is the time spent in communication on the network.

This model assumes that for any subset of $q$ processors, a block permutation among the $q$ processors takes $(\tau+\sigma m)$ time, where $m$ is the size of the largest block.

== Analysis of common parallel algorithms ==
Complexities of common parallel algorithms contained in the MPI libraries:

- Point to point communication: $O(\tau+\sigma m)$
- Reduction :$O(log(p) (\tau+\sigma m))$
- Broadcast: $O(log(p) (\tau+\sigma m))$
- Parallel prefix: $O(log(p){n\over p} (\tau+\sigma m))$
- All to all: $O(p(\tau+\sigma m)) )$
