= Ruby (hardware description language) =

Formal language for specifying integrated circuits

Ruby is a hardware description language designed by Mary Sheeran in 1986 intended to facilitate the notation and development of integrated circuits via relational algebra and functional programming.

It should not be confused with RHDL, a hardware description language based on the 1995 Ruby programming language.
