= Racetrack Television Network =

American sports TV network

Racetrack Television Network (RTN) is a multi-channel television network dedicated to providing live simulcasting of Thoroughbred, harness, American Quarter Horse, and greyhound racing throughout the world, along with jai alai, using multiple broadcast feeds.

RTN's full schedule is available on Dish Network in the channel 9701–9780 range (which additionally provides access to TVG2 and VSiN programming), along with an OTT website, a Roku channel, and Android and Fire TV apps.
