= Hybrid-core computing =

Set architecture

Hybrid-core computing is the technique of extending a commodity instruction set architecture (e.g. x86) with application-specific instructions to accelerate application performance. It is a form of heterogeneous computing wherein asymmetric computational units coexist with a "commodity" processor.

Hybrid-core processing differs from general heterogeneous computing in that the computational units share a common logical address space, and an executable is composed of a single instruction stream—in essence a contemporary coprocessor. The instruction set of a hybrid-core computing system contains instructions that can be dispatched either to the host instruction set or to the application-specific hardware.

Typically, hybrid-core computing is best deployed where the predominance of computational cycles are spent in a few identifiable kernels, as is often seen in high-performance computing applications. Acceleration is especially pronounced when the kernel's logic maps poorly to a sequence of commodity processor instructions, and/or maps well to the application-specific hardware.

Hybrid-core computing is used to accelerate applications beyond what is currently physically possible with off-the-shelf processors, or to lower power & cooling costs in a data center by reducing computational footprint. (i.e., to circumvent obstacles such as the power/density challenges faced with today's commodity processors).
