= Register transfer notation =

Register Transfer Notation (or RTN) is a way of specifying the behavior of a digital synchronous circuit. It is said to be a specification language for this reason. Register Transfer Languages (or RTL, where the L sometimes stands for Level of abstraction) are similar to Register Transfer Notation and used to describe much the same thing, however they are of a synthesizable format and more similar to a standard computer programming language, like C.

RTN may be written as either abstract or concrete. Abstract RTN is a generic notation which does not have any specific machine implementation details. In contrast, concrete RTN is a notation which does implement specifics of the machine for which it is designed. The possible locations in which transfer of information occurs are:

1. Memory-location
2. Processor Register
3. Registers in I/O device
