= Nallatech =

American computer hardware and software firm

Nallatech is a computer hardware and software firm based in Camarillo, California, United States. The company specializes in field-programmable gate array (FPGA) integrated circuit technology applied in computing. As of 2007 the company's primary markets include defense and high-performance computing. Nallatech was acquired by Interconnect Systems, Inc. in 2008, which in turn was bought by Molex in 2016.

== Background ==
The company was founded by Allan Cantle ('Nalla' comes from 'Allan' spelled backwards) in 1993 and was backed by over £4 million of equity finance provided by Scottish Equity Partners and 3i. Cantle was the CEO for the firm, later moving into president and CTO roles.

In 2005 Nallatech announced a Scottish group known as the FPGA High Performance Computing Alliance, to work on a supercomputer.

Nallatech's direct sales team operates in two main geographic areas, one in the US and one in UK covering UK, Europe and rest of the world. The team in the USA (Nallatech, Inc.) sales office in Eldersburg, Maryland and headquartered in Camarillo, California.

Nallatech is a member of the OpenPOWER Foundation.

== Products ==
Nallatech was promoted for commercial off-the-shelf (COTS) FPGA technology applied in computing. According to David R. Martinez, Robert A. Bond, and M. Michael Vai, Nallatech systems are "based on a modular design concept in which the designer chooses the number of FPGAs, amount and type of memory, and other expansion cards to include in a system."

Nallatech is also known for its motherboards with PCI cards which provide a "high throughput connection over which a host PC can provide and receive data and monitor system performance."

On June 17, 2015, it released the 385A FPGA Accelerator Card, which includes the Altera Arria 10 / 1150 FPGA, PCI-Express form factor and works with most major servers, including IBM, HP and Dell.

In March 2011 the company announced a miniaturization service for its FPGAs.

In 2012, Nallatech has partnered with Altera, and integrated its PCI Express card with Stratix V FPGAs.

Xilinx's Xtreme DSP kit was developed with Nallatech, and like Xilinx, Nallatech uses "floating-point cores" in its FPGAs.
