= Mitrionics =

Swedish manufacturing company

Mitrionics was a Swedish company manufacturing softcore reconfigurable processors. It has been mentioned as one of EETimes "60 Emerging startups". The company was founded as Flow Computing in 2002 by Stefan Möhl, Pontus Borg, Andreas Rodman and Christian Merheim to commercialize a massively parallel reconfigurable processor implemented on FPGAs. Mitrion-C was then invented and developed by Stefan Möhl and Pontus Borg. It can be described as turning general purpose chips into massive parallel processors that can be used for high performance computing. Mitrionics massively parallel processor is available on Cray, Nallatech, and Silicon Graphics systems.

The Mitrion Platform consists of the Mitrion Virtual Processor and Mitrion Software Development Kit. The SDK includes a parallel C-family language called Mitrion-C used to program the Mitrion Virtual Processor. Since the Mitrion Virtual Processor can be programmed in software, FPGAs become easier to use as computer accelerators than using hardware design tools such as VHDL or Verilog. The Mitrionics technology claims to make supercomputing performance acceleration accessible to an entire new market of scientists and developers previously unable to benefit from it because of high prices, complex design skills needed, and extremely long development times.

The Mitrion Platform was launched in 2005 and has been used by many of the world's leading supercomputing organizations including NCSA, Oak Ridge National Laboratory, George Washington University, McGill University, National Cancer Institute and Konrad-Zuse Institute Berlin.

Mitrionics is headquartered in Lund, Sweden.
