= Outline of electronics =

Overview of and topical guide to electronics

The following outline is provided as an overview of and topical guide to electronics:

Electronics – branch of physics, engineering and technology dealing with electrical circuits that involve active semiconductor components and associated passive interconnection technologies.

== Branches ==
=== Classical electronics ===
- Analog electronics
- Digital electronics
- Electronic instrumentation
- Electronic engineering
- Microelectronics
- Optoelectronics
- Power electronics
- Printed electronics
- Semiconductor technology
- Schematic capture
- Thermal management
- Automation Electronics

=== Advanced topics ===
- Atomtronics
- Bioelectronics
- Failure modes of electronics
- Flexible electronics
- Low-power electronics
- Microelectromechanical systems (MEMS)
- Molecular electronics
- Nanoelectronics
- Organic electronics
- Photonics
- Piezotronics
- Quantum electronics
- Spintronics

=== History of electronics ===
- History of electronic engineering
- History of radar
- History of radio
- History of television

== General concepts ==
=== Data converters ===
- Analog-to-digital converters (ADC)
  - Aliasing
  - Successive approximation ADC
  - Dual-slope ADC
  - Quantization
  - Sensor resolution
  - Sampling
  - Delta-sigma ADC
- Digital-to-analog converters (DAC)
  - Digital potentiometer
  - Binary weighted resistor converter
  - Charge distribution DAC
  - Pulse width modulator
  - Reconstruction filter
  - The R2R ladder

=== Digital electronics ===
- Binary decision diagrams
- Boolean algebra
- Combinational logic
- Counters (digital)
- De Morgan's laws
- Digital circuit
- Formal verification
- Karnaugh maps
- Logic families
- Logic gate
- Logic minimization
- Logic simulation
- Logic synthesis
- Registers
- Sequential logic
- State machines
- Truth tables
- Transparent latch

=== Electrical element/discretes ===
- Passive elements:
  - Capacitor
  - Inductor
  - Memristor
  - Resistor
  - Transformer
- Active elements:
  - Diode
    - Zener diode
    - Light-emitting diode
    - PIN diode
    - Schottky diode
    - Avalanche diode
    - Laser diode
    - Microcontroller
    - Operational amplifier
  - Thyristor
    - DIAC
    - TRIAC
    - IGBT
  - Transistor
    - Bipolar transistor (BJT)
    - Field effect transistor (FET)
    - Darlington transistor
- Other components
  - Aural devices
  - Battery (electricity)
  - Crystal oscillator
  - Electromechanical devices
  - Sensors
  - Surface acoustic wave (SAW)

=== Electronics analysis ===
- Electronic packaging
- Electronic circuit simulation
- Electronic design automation
- Electronic noise
- Mathematical methods in electronics
- Thermal management of electronic devices and systems

=== Electronic circuits ===
- Amplifiers
  - Differential amplifiers
  - Feedback amplifiers
  - Power amplifiers
- Comparators
- Converters
- Filters
  - Active filters
  - Passive filters
  - Digital filters
- Oscillators
- Phase-locked loops
- Timers

=== Electronic equipment ===
- Air conditioner
- Breathalyzer
- Central heating
- Clothes dryer
- Computer/Notebook
- Dishwasher
- Freezer
- Home robot
- Home entertainment system
- Information technologies
- Cooker
- Microwave oven
- Refrigerator
- Robotic vacuum cleaner
- Tablet
- Telephone
- Water heater
- Washing machine

=== Television ===
- Analog television
- History of television
- Television show
- Television broadcaster
- Timeline of the introduction of television in countries
- Mechanical television
- Color television
- Digital television
  - Digital television transition
- Smart television
- Streaming television
- Internet Protocol television
- 3D television
- Terrestrial television

=== Electronic instrumentation ===
- Ammeter
- Capacitance meter
- Distortionmeter
- Electric energy meter
- LCR meter
- Microwave power meter
- Multimeter
- Network analyzer
- Ohmmeter
- Oscilloscope
- Psophometer
- Q meter
- Signal analyzer
- Signal generator
- Spectrum analyzer
- Transistor tester
- Tube tester
- Wattmeter
- Vectorscope
- Video signal generator
- Voltmeter
- VU meter

=== Memory technology ===
  - Flash memory
  - Hard drive systems
  - Optical storage
  - Probe Storage
  - Programmable read-only memory
  - Read-only memory
  - Solid-state drive (SSD)
  - Volatile memory

=== Microcontrollers ===
- Features
  - Analog-to-digital converter
  - Central processing unit (CPU)
  - Clock generator (Quartz timing crystal, resonator or RC circuit)
  - Debugging support
  - Digital-to-analog converters
  - Discrete input and output bits
  - In-circuit programming
  - Non-volatile memory (ROM, EPROM, EEPROM or Flash)
  - Peripherals (Timers, event counters, PWM generators, and watchdog)
  - Serial interface (Input/output such as serial ports (UARTs))
  - Serial communications (I²C, Serial Peripheral Interface and Controller Area Network)
  - Volatile memory (RAM)
- 8-bit microcontroller families:

AVR - PIC - COP8 - MCS-48 - MCS-51 - Z8 - eZ80 - HC08 - HC11 - H8 - PSoC

- Some notable suppliers:
  - ARM
  - Atmel
  - Cypress Semiconductor
  - Freescale
  - Intel
  - MIPS
  - Microchip Technology
  - NXP Semiconductors
  - Parallax Propeller
  - PowerPC
  - Rabbit 2000
  - Renesas RX, V850
  - Silicon Laboratories
  - STMicroelectronics
  - Texas Instruments
  - Toshiba TLCS

=== Optoelectronics ===
- Optical fiber
- Optical properties
- Optical receivers
- Optical system design
- Optical transmitters

=== Physical laws ===
- Ampère's law
- Coulomb's law
- Faraday's law of induction/Faraday-Lenz law
- Gauss's law
- Kirchhoff's circuit laws
  - Current law
  - Voltage law
- Maxwell's equations
  - Gauss's law
  - Faraday's law of induction
  - Ampère's law
- Ohm's law

=== Power electronics ===
- Power Devices
  - Gate turn-off thyristor
  - MOS-controlled thyristor (MCT)
  - Power BJT/MOSFET
  - Static induction devices
- Electric power conversion
  - DC to DC
    - DC to DC converter
    - Voltage stabiliser
    - Linear regulator
  - AC to DC
    - Rectifier
    - Mains power supply unit (PSU)
    - Switched-mode power supply
  - DC to AC
    - Inverter
  - AC to AC
    - Cycloconverter
    - Transformer
    - Variable frequency transformer
    - Voltage converter
    - Voltage regulator
- Power applications
  - Automotive applications
  - Capacitor charging applications
  - Electronic ballasts
  - Energy harvesting technologies
  - Flexible AC transmission systems (FACTS)
  - High frequency inverters
  - HVDC transmission
  - Motor controller
  - Photovoltaic system Conversion
  - Power factor correction circuits
  - Power supply
  - Renewable energy sources
  - Switching power converters
  - Uninterruptible power supply
  - Wind power

=== Programmable devices ===
- Application-specific integrated circuit (ASIC)
- Complex programmable logic device (CPLD)
- Erasable programmable logic device (EPLD)
- Simple programmable logic device (SPLD)
- Macrocell array
- Programmable array logic (PAL)
- Programmable logic array (PLA)
- Programmable logic device (PLD)
- Field-programmable gate array (FPGA)
- VHSIC Hardware Description Language (VHDL)
- Verilog Hardware Description Language
- Some notable suppliers:

Altera - Atmel - Cypress Semiconductor - Lattice Semiconductor - Xilinx

=== Semiconductors theory ===
- Properties
  - Bipolar junction transistors
  - Capacitance voltage profiling
  - Charge carrier
  - Charge-transfer complex
  - Deep-level transient spectroscopy
  - Depletion region
  - Density of states
  - Diode modelling
  - Direct band gap
  - Electronic band structure
  - Energy level
  - Exciton
  - Field-effect transistors
  - Metal–semiconductor junction
  - MOSFETs
  - N-type semiconductor
  - Organic semiconductors
  - P–n junction
  - P-type semiconductor
  - Photoelectric effect
  - Quantum tunneling
  - Semiconductor chip
  - Semiconductor detector
  - Solar cell
  - Transistor model
  - Thin film
  - Tight-binding model
- Device Fabrication
  - Semiconductor device fabrication
  - Semiconductor industry
  - Semiconductor consolidation

== Applications ==
- Audio electronics
- Automotive electronics
- Avionics
- Control Systems
- Consumer electronics
- Data acquisition
- E-health
- Electronic book
- Electronics industry
- Electronic warfare
- Embedded systems
- Home automation
- Integrated circuits
- Marine electronics
- Microwave technology
- Military electronics
- Multimedia
- Nuclear electronics
- Open hardware
- Radar and Radionavigation
- Radio electronics
- Terahertz technology
- Video hardware
- Wired and Wireless Communications

== See also ==
- Outline of electrical engineering
