= GAL22V10 =

Series of programmable-logic devices from Lattice Semiconductor

- Design firm: Lattice Semiconductor
- Type: Series of programmable-logic devices

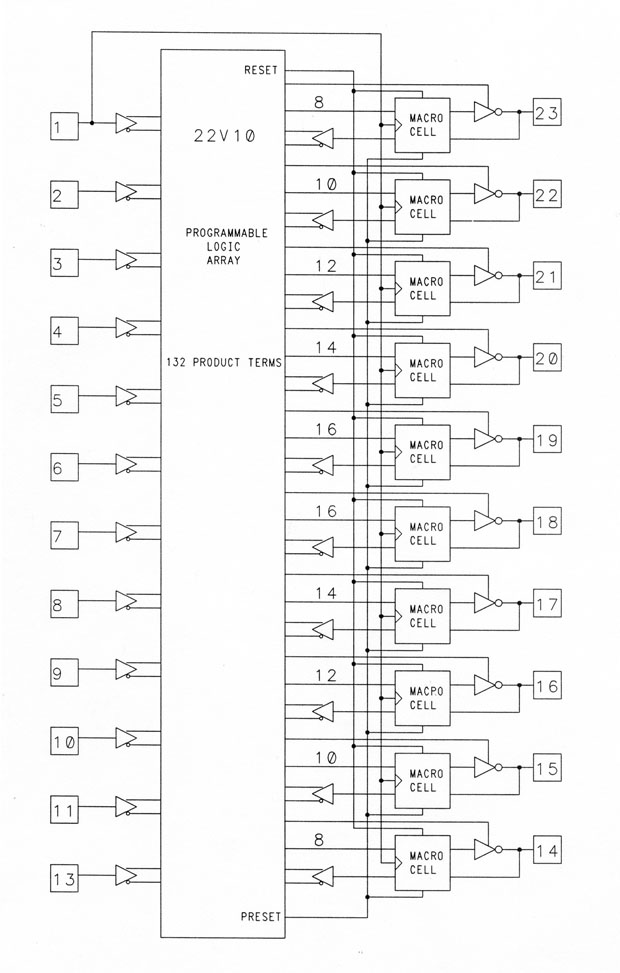
AMD PAL22V10 block diagram (same as GAL22V10)

The GAL22V10 is a series of programmable-logic devices from Lattice Semiconductor, implemented as CMOS-based generic array logic ICs, and available in dual inline packages or plastic leaded chip carriers. It is an example of a standard production GAL (General Array Logic) device that is often used in educational settings as a basic programmable-logic device. In combinatorial mode, it is conceptually a group of programmable AND-OR-invert (AOI) (AND-NOR) gates or AND-OR gates.

== Specifications ==
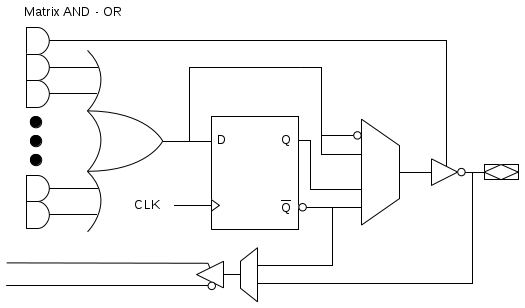
GAL22V10 Output Logic MacroCell (OLMC)

The GAL22V10 has 12 input pins, and 10 pins that can be configured as either inputs or outputs, and exists in various switching speeds, from 25 to 4 ns. Each output is driven by an output-logic macrocell (OLMC), with an output-enable product term, and a variable number of product terms, ranging from eight to sixteen. Each OLMC may be set to output as inverting or non-inverting, and be placed into either registered or combinatorial mode. In registered mode, each macrocell actively uses a D-flip-flop to hold a state under control of the data input from the logic portion of the macrocell and the rising edge of the clock signal, while in combinatorial mode the flip-flop is removed from the macrocell and the outputs are driven directly by the logic. In the latter mode, the pin may also dynamically switch between input and output based on the product term. In either mode the pin value is fed back into the array as a product term. Combinations are set using an E^{2}PROM. The output registers can be preloaded into a potentially invalid state for testing by a GAL22V10 programmer. Inputs and outputs include active pull-ups and are transistor-transistor logic compatible due to high-impedance buffers.

A user electronic signature section is included for details such as user ID codes, revision IDs, or asset tagging on official Lattice Semiconductor units, as well as a static ES section for compatibility with non-Lattice Semiconductor GAL22V10 units. In addition, a security cell is included which, when set, disallows the retrieval of the array logic from the chip, until a new set of logic is set.

Latch-up protection is implemented using n-pullups and a charge pump in the official Lattice Semiconductor models.

== Availability ==
The GAL22V10D had been discontinued by Lattice Semiconductor as of June 2010 with the last shipment in June 2011. No pin-compatible replacements have been offered or recommended by Lattice.

Multiple variations of the Microchip / Atmel ATF22V10 are pin-compatible replacements, and available in PDIP, SOIC, PLCC, TSSOP packages.

== Related parts ==
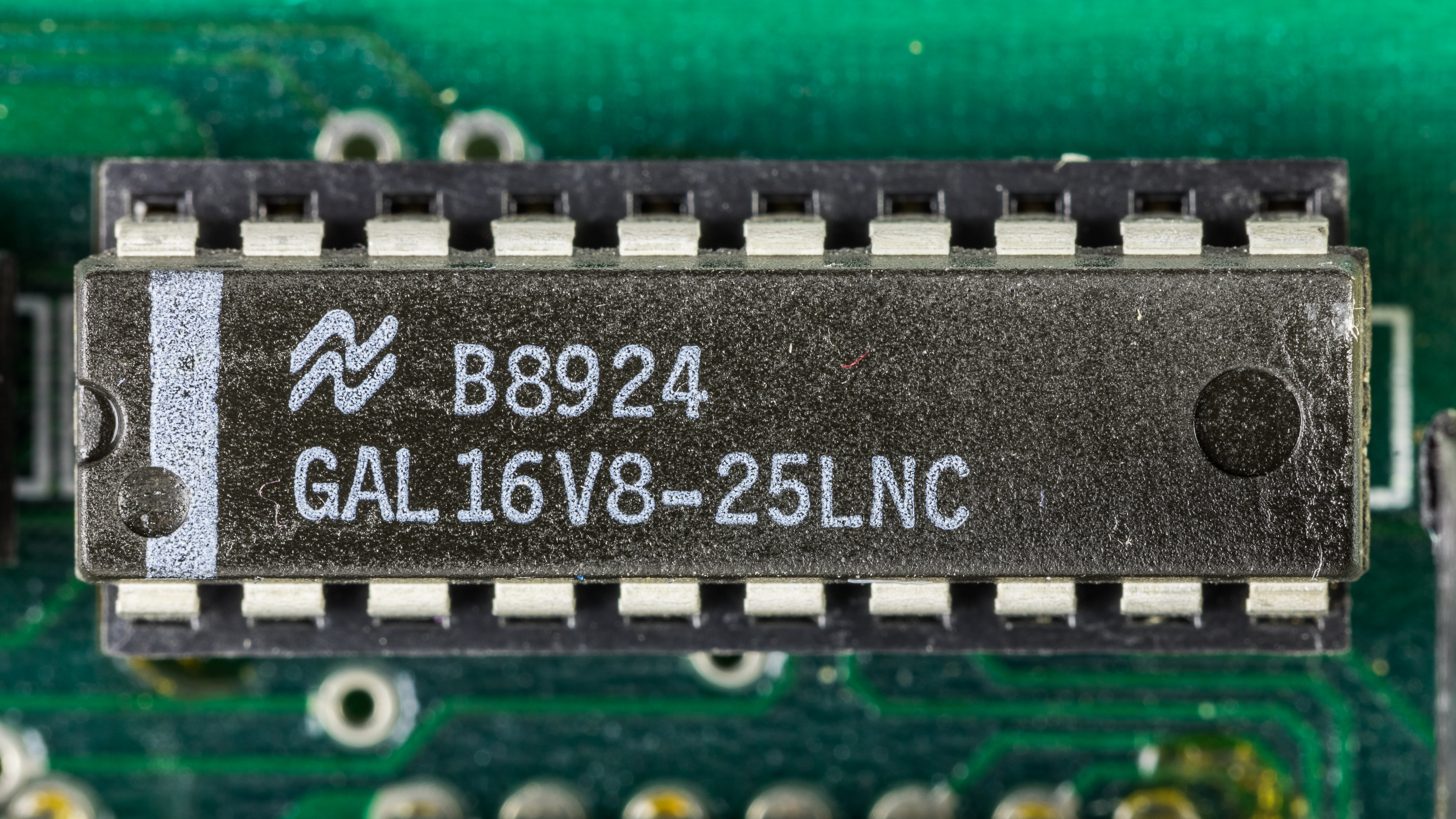
National GAL16V8 in DIP-20N package

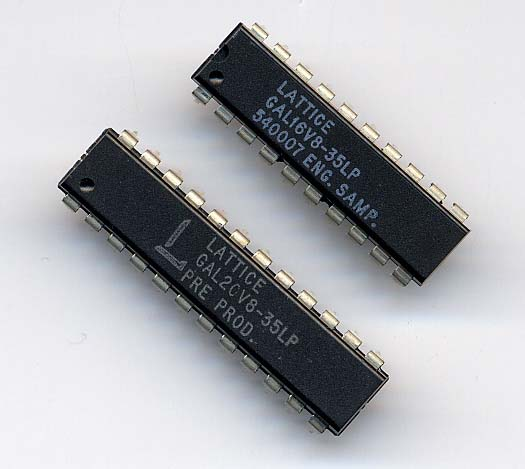
Lattice GAL16V8 & GAL20V8 in DIP-20N and DIP-24N packages

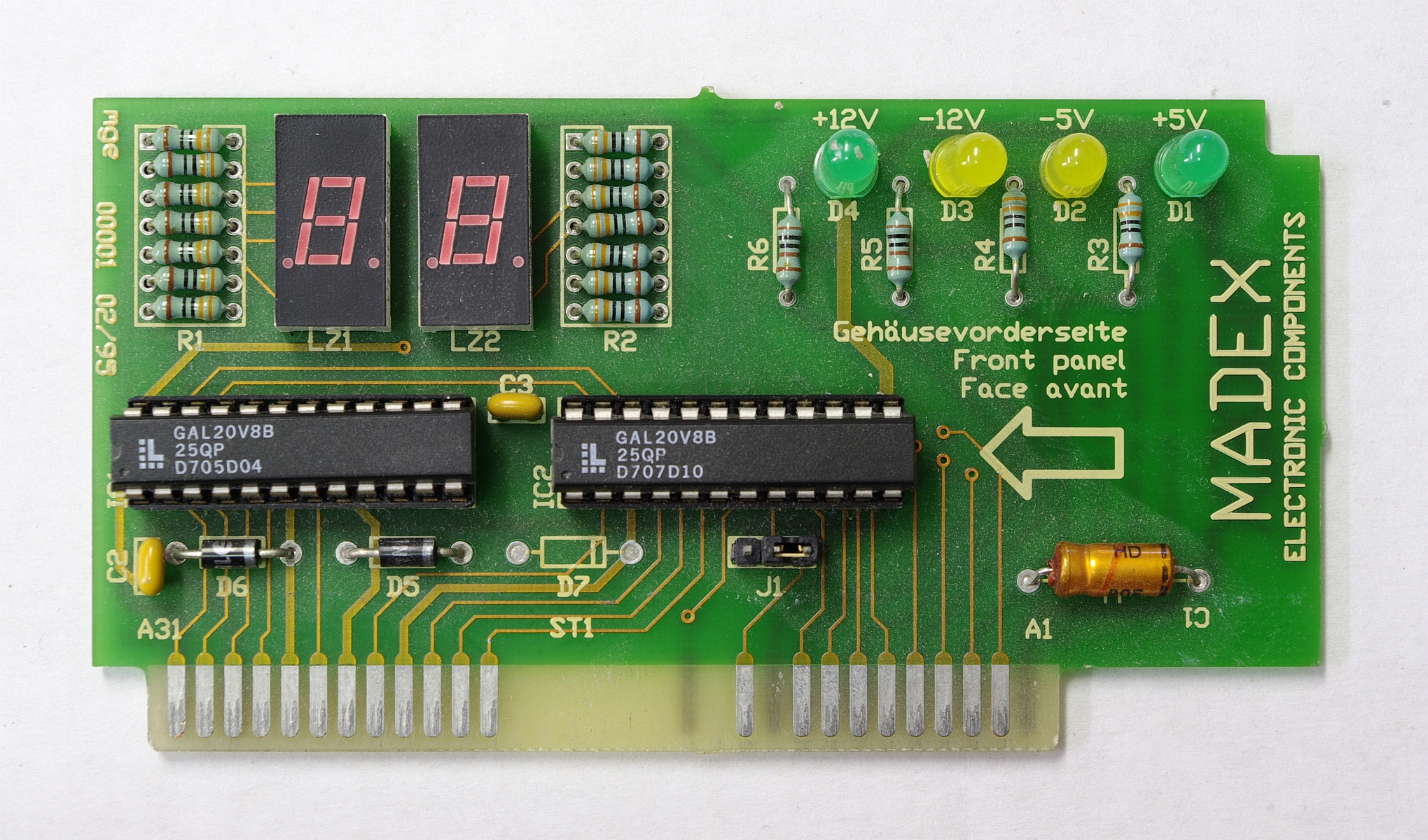
Two Lattice GAL20V8 on an ISA bus POST card

The GAL16V8 and GAL20V8 are similar in concept to the GAL22V10, but have fewer I/O pins in smaller packages.
