= UES =

UES may refer to:

- C.D. Universidad de El Salvador, a professional football team representing the University of El Salvador
- Estadio Universitario UES, a multi-use stadium in San Salvador, El Salvador
- FGC UES, the owner and operator of the electricity transmission grid in Russia
- RAO UES, an electric power holding company in Russia
- UES (cipher), a block cipher designed in 1999 by Helena Handschuh and Serge Vaudenay
- User Electronic Signature
- Unified Export Strategy, an application process that US agricultural trade promotion groups use to apply for funding
- Union des Employes de Service, Local 298 v. Bibeault, a Canadian Supreme Court case regarding judicial review in Canadian administrative law
- University of El Salvador, the oldest and one of the most prominent university institutions in El Salvador
- Upper East Side, a neighborhood in the borough of Manhattan in New York City
- Upper Eastside, a neighborhood of the city of Miami, Florida, United States
- Upper esophageal sphincter, the superior portion of the esophagus
