= STAPL =

In computer engineering, STAPL may refer to:

- the C++ Standard Template Adaptive Parallel Library
- JEDEC standard JESD-71, Altera's JAM/STAPL Standard Test and Programming Language.
