= User Electronic Signature =

User-defined bitfield in a programmable logic device

The User Electronic Signature (UES) is a bitfield with user-defined content in a programmable logic device (PLD). It is usually used for the storage of the ID and/or version number of the PLD, suited for serial identification. Examples for PLD's with a UES are the industry standards GAL16V8 and GAL22V10. The size of the UES is device-dependent.
