= Monolithic Memories =

American semiconductor company (1969–1987)

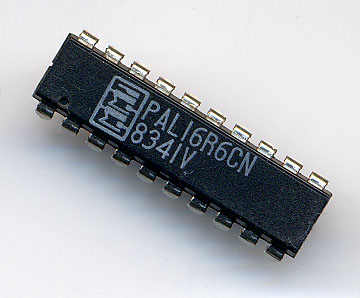
MMI PAL 16R6 in 20-pin DIP. The original "printed-circuit" logo appears here; it was later replaced by a simpler design.

Monolithic Memories, Inc. (MMI) was an American semiconductor company which produced bipolar PROMs, programmable logic devices, and logic circuits (including 7400 series TTL).

A team of MMI engineers, under the direction of Ze'ev Drori and headed by John Birkner and H. T. Chua, invented the class of devices known as programmable array logic (PAL).

MMI was founded in 1969 by former Fairchild Semiconductor engineer Ze'ev Drori, later the president and CEO of Tesla Motors. In 1987, under the stewardship of President Irwin Federman, it was merged with Advanced Micro Devices in a $422 million stock swap to become the world's largest integrated circuit manufacturer. AMD later spun off their programmable logic division as Vantis, which was then acquired by Lattice Semiconductor.

== See also ==
- Bit-slice processor (MMI 5700/6700)
- Programmable Array Logic (PAL 22V10)
