= Agilex =

Family of semiconductor products

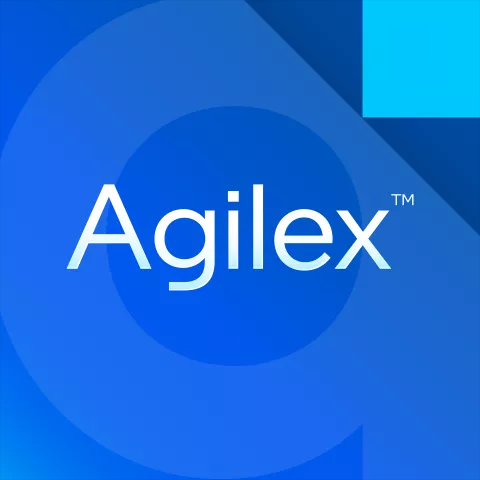

Agilex is a brand covering several families of FPGA products developed by Altera, and is the branding introduced in 2019 during the Intel era. The initial family of Agilex FPGAs (now rebranded as Agilex 7) began shipping in 2019 and are built using Intel 10nm silicon process. Agilex FPGAs are typically programmed in hardware description languages such as VHDL or Verilog, and compiled using the Quartus Prime computer software. Higher level design languages, such as C++ with SYCL extensions, are supported as well.

== Product Families ==
Agilex FPGAs initially focused on performance applications such as data center processing, but the brand was expanded to include several new series of Agilex FPGAs which have different characteristics, such as lower power and lower logic densities, in order to fit an even wider range of applications. As a result, the Agilex brand is combined with a numerical suffix to organize various FPGA product series into different families of FPGAs and SoC FPGAs.

=== Agilex 9 ===
The Agilex 9 family are FPGAs targeted at Direct RF applications and include wideband data converters with sample rates up to 64Gsps and medium-band data converters with hi-fidelity performance.

=== Agilex 7 ===
The initial family of Agilex FPGAs and SoC FPGAs which began shipping in 2019 were rebranded as Agilex 7 in January 2023 as the Agilex brand was broadened to cover additional FPGA families by using a numerical suffix. Agilex 7 FPGAs are a family of high-performance FPGAs with a focus on delivering industry-leading logic fabric and I/O speeds and targeted at bandwidth- and compute-intensive applications. The Agilex 7 SoC FPGA variants include an ARM Cortex-A53 quad core hard processor system.

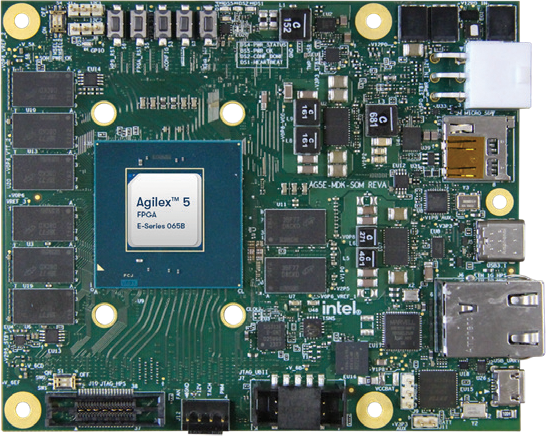
Altera Agilex 5 FPGA E-series 065B Modular Board

=== Agilex 5 ===
The Agilex 5 family are FPGAs and SoC FPGAs with lower power and logic densities than the Agilex 7 FPGA and are generally considered mid-range FPGAs. The Agilex 5 SoC FPGA variants include an ARM Cortex-A76/A55 quad core hard processor system.

=== Agilex 3 ===
The Agilex 3 family are power and cost optimized FPGAs that deliver relatively high performance for this class of FPGA. The Agilex 3 SoC FPGA variants offer an ARM Cortex-A55 dual core hard processor system.
