= Generic Array Logic =

Type of digital circuit

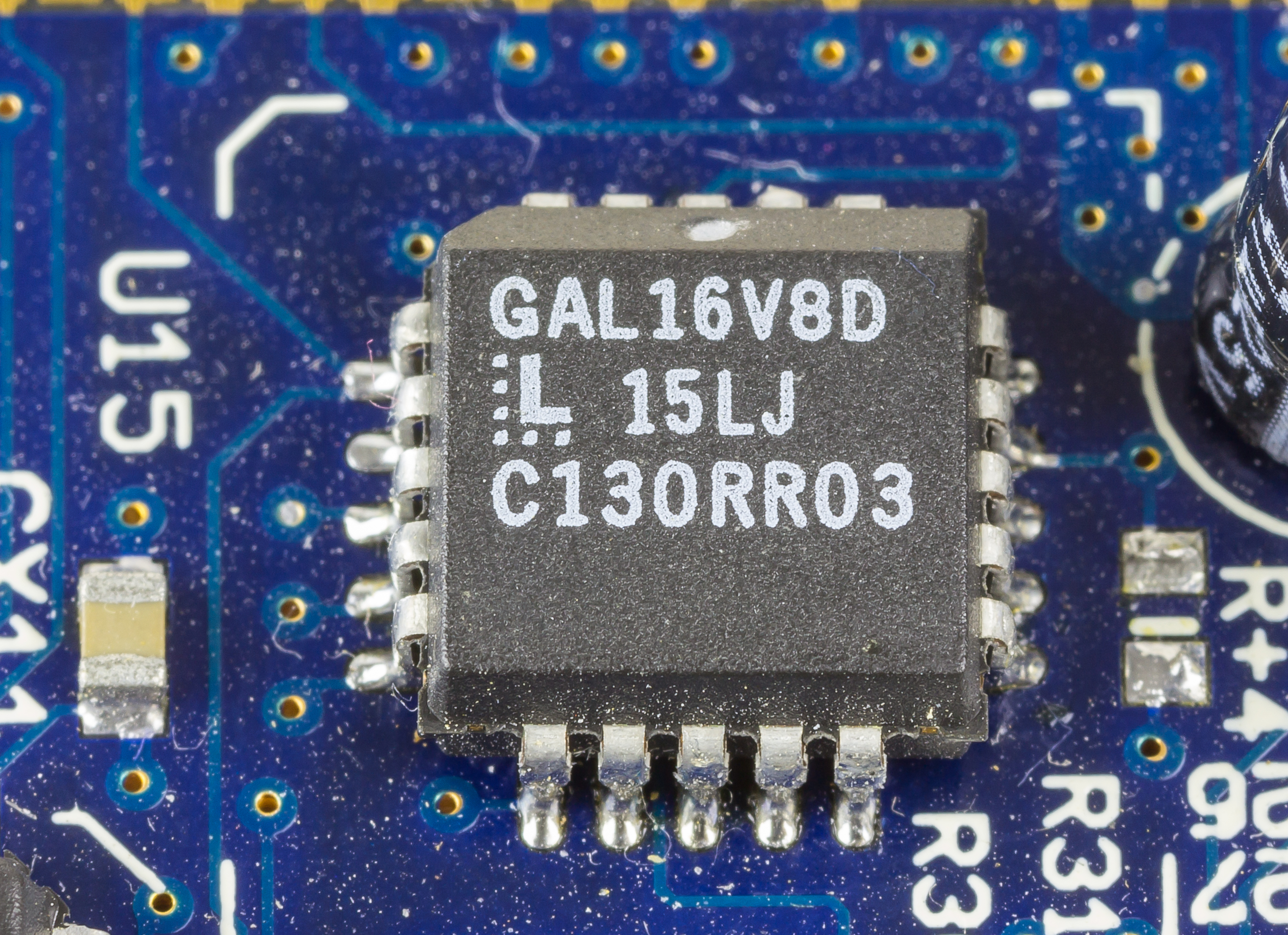
Lattice GAL16V8D-15LJ

The Generic Array Logic (also known as GAL and sometimes as gate array logic) device was an innovation of the PAL and was invented by Lattice Semiconductor. The GAL was an improvement on the PAL because one device type was able to take the place of many PAL device types or could even have functionality not covered by the original range of PAL devices. Its primary benefit, however, was that it was erasable and re-programmable, making prototyping and design changes easier for engineers.

A similar device called a PEEL (programmable electrically erasable logic) was introduced by the International CMOS Technology (ICT) corporation.

== See also ==
- Programmable logic device (PLD)
  - Complex programmable logic device (CPLD)
  - Erasable programmable logic device (EPLD)
- GAL22V10
