= Cypress Semiconductor =

Defunct American semiconductor company

Cypress Semiconductor Corporation
- Type: Subsidiary
- Traded as: Nasdaq: CY; NYSE: CY
- Industry: Semiconductors
- Founded: 1982; 44 years ago
- Defunct: 2020
- Fate: Acquired by Infineon Technologies
- Headquarters: San Jose, California, U.S.
- Revenue: ▲US$2.48 billion (2018)
- Operating income: ▲US$164.43 million (2018)
- Net income: ▲US$354.83 million (2018)
- Total assets: ▲US$3.69 billion (2018)
- Total equity: ▲US$2.12 billion (2018)
- Number of employees: 5,846 (2018)
- Divisions: Programmable Systems; Memory Products; Data Communications; Emerging Technologies
- Website: cypress.com

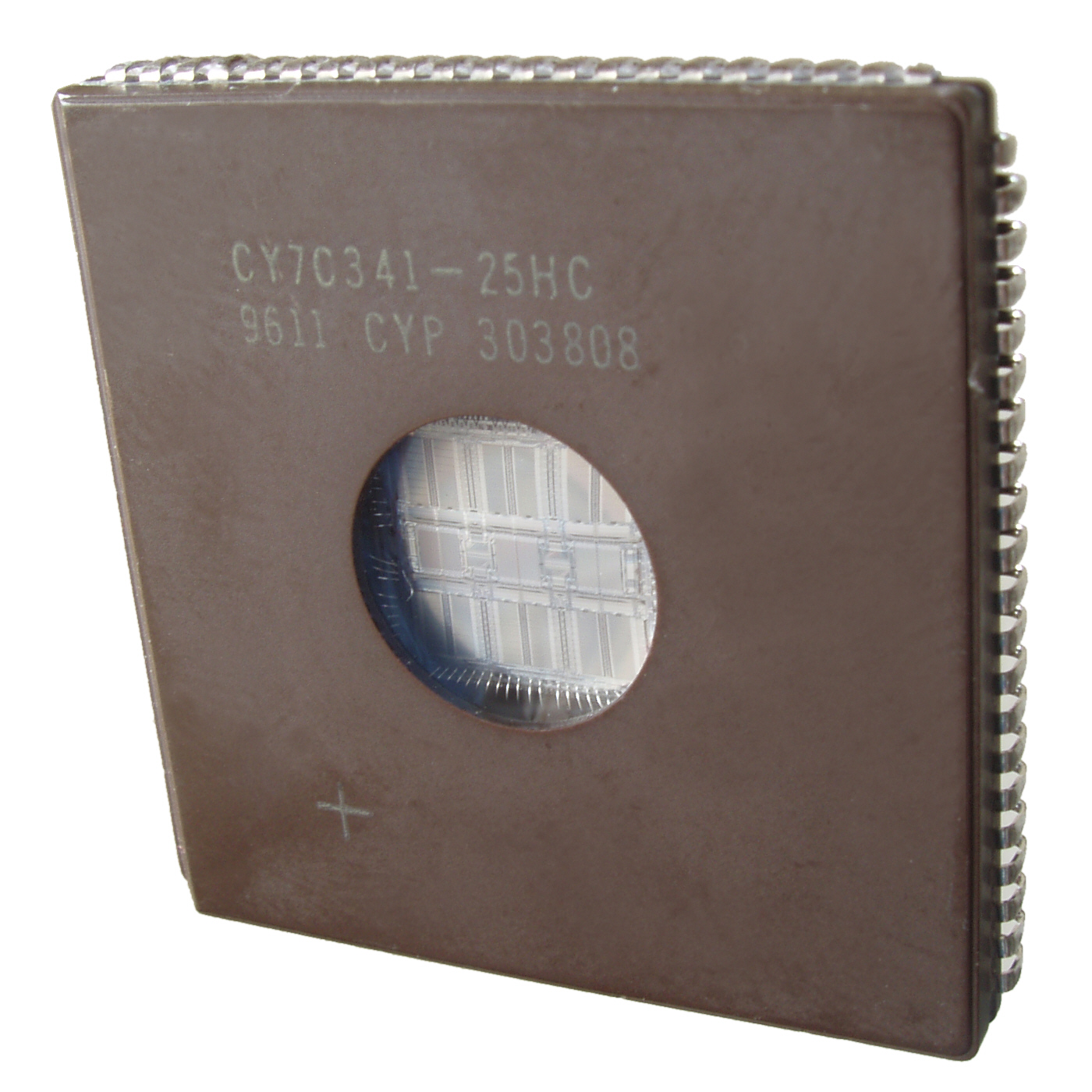
An EPLD from Cypress Semiconductor in a PLCC-package

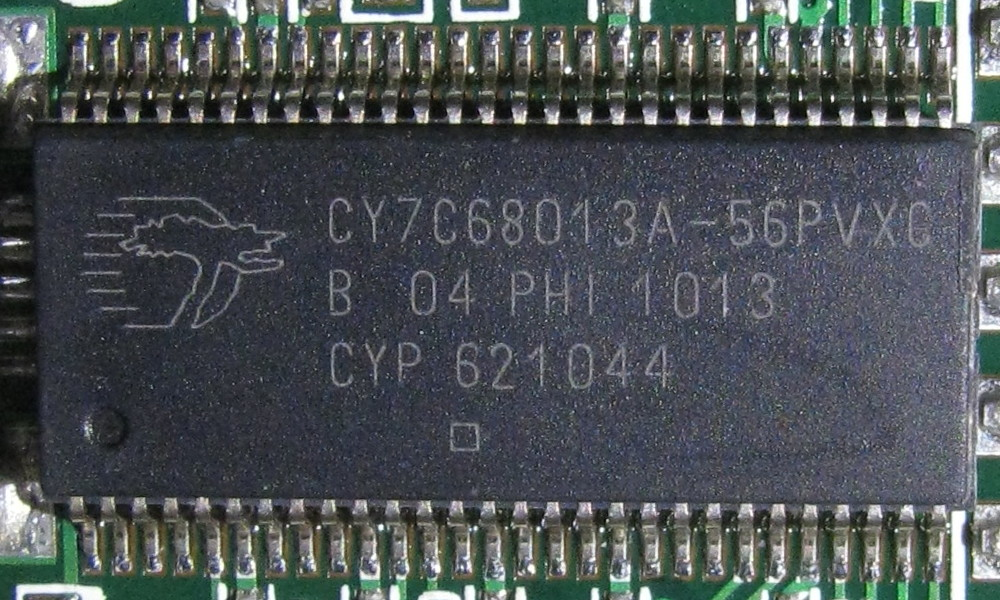
A Cypress USB microcontroller

Cypress Semiconductor Corporation was an American semiconductor design and manufacturing company. It offered NOR flash memories, F-RAM and SRAM Traveo microcontrollers, PSoCs, PMICs, capacitive touch-sensing controllers, Wireless BLE Bluetooth Low-Energy and USB connectivity solutions.

Its headquarters were in San Jose, California, with operations in the United States, Ireland, India and the Philippines.

In April 2016, Cypress Semiconductors announced the acquisition of Broadcom’s Wireless Internet of Things Business. The deal was closed in July 2016.

In June 2019, Infineon Technologies announced it would acquire Cypress for $9.4 billion. The deal closed in April 2020, making Infineon one of the world's top 10 semiconductor manufacturers.

Some of its main competitors included Microchip Technology, NXP Semiconductors, Renesas Electronics and Micron Technology.

== History ==
=== Founding and early years ===
It was founded by T. J. Rodgers and others (Fritz Beyerlein, Fred Jenne, Steven H. Kaplan, R. Michael Starnes and Lowell Turriff) from Advanced Micro Devices. It was formed in 1982 with backing by Sevin Rosen, Kleiner Perkins Caufield & Byers, Mayfield Fund and Sequoia Capital. The initial Venture Capital investment was $7.5 million. Cypress went public on the NASDAQ in 1986. The company initially focused on the design and development of high speed CMOS SRAMs, EEPROMs, PAL devices, and TTL devices. Two years after going public the company switched from the NASDAQ to the New York Stock Exchange. In October 2009, the company announced it would switch its listing to the NASDAQ on November 12, 2009.

The AgigA Tech, Inc. subsidiary sells non-volatile random-access memory (RAM). It was acquired during the Simtek purchase in August 2008, and marks the second time that Cypress acquired a start-up venture from founder, Ron Sartore, who also co-founded Anchor Chips. The division was sold to the Unigen Corporation in May 2021.

In November 2011, Cypress also backed a packaging firm called Deca Technologies, Inc.

=== 2015 ===
In December 2014, Cypress Semiconductor merged with Spansion in an all-stock deal worth $1.59 billion. The merger represented the combination of two companies that were No. 1 in their respective memory markets and have successfully diversified into embedded processing.

In March 2015, Cypress and Spansion completed of the transactions of the merger in an all-stock, tax-free transaction valued at approximately $5 billion. Cypress shareholders approved the issuance of 2.457 shares of Cypress stock to Spansion shareholders for each Spansion share they own. The merger is expected to achieve more than $135 million in cost synergies on an annualized basis within three years and to be accretive to non-GAAP earnings within the first full year after the transaction closes. At the time of its merger with Spansion in 2015, Cypress Semiconductor had more than 7,000 US and foreign patents. Cypress Semiconductor is a component of the Ocean Tomo 300 Patent Index.

Cypress attempted to acquire Integrated Silicon Solution Inc. in 2015 but was thwarted by a competing bid by Chinese buyer consortium Uphill Investment Co., which included GigaDevice, a major competitor in the NOR flash market. This buyer consortium offered a higher bid than Cypress and successfully acquired ISSI for $731 million.

Also in 2015, Cypress tried to acquire Atmel, but was outbid by Dialog Semiconductor (in the end, Microchip Technology made the deal).

=== 2016 ===
In April 2016, Cypress announced the acquisition of Broadcom’s Wireless Internet of Things (IoT) business and related assets in an all-cash transaction valued at $550 million. Under the terms of the deal, Cypress will acquire Broadcom's Wi-Fi, Bluetooth and Zigbee IoT product lines and intellectual property, along with its WICED brand and developer ecosystem.

In April 2016, it was announced that Advanced Semiconductor Engineering, Inc. will invest $60 million in Deca and will license Deca’s M-Series fan-out wafer-level packaging (FOWLP) technologies and processes. As part of the agreement, ASE Group and Deca will jointly develop the M-Series fan-out manufacturing process and will expand production of chip-scale packages using this technology.

Cypress named Hassane El-Khoury its president and chief executive officer, and announced he will join the board of directors on Aug. 11, 2016.

=== 2017 board dispute ===
In April 2017 Delaware Chancery Court decided Cypress Semiconductor Corp. had to give former CEO Rodgers insight into internal documents related to possible violations of Cypress's Code of Business Conduct and Ethics by executive chairman Ray Bingham.

Bingham, who is a founding member of venture capital firm Canyon Bridge Capital Partners Inc, a China state-backed private equity fund, was criticized for the conflict of interest leading Cypress and Canyon Bridge as both companies possibly focus on the same acquisition targets.

Rodgers ran a proxy contest against the board, aiming for veteran tech industry board directors Daniel McCranie and Camillo Martino to replace Ray Bingham and Cypress director Éric Benhamou.

On June 12, 2017 it was made public that Ray Bingham stepped down from the board. Prior to Bingham’s resignation, shareholder-advisory firms ISS, Glass Lewis and Egan-Jones had recommended McCranie and Martino, Rodgers's nominees, citing "additional - and sharper - questions not only regarding the board's handling of this situation but also regarding the potential for conflicts of interest inherent in Bingham's dual roles".

On June 20, 2017, both of Rodgers's nominees won victories by substantial margins.

=== 2019-2020 merger ===
In 2019, under CEO Hassane El-Khouri, the company agreed to the offer of Infineon Technologies valued about $9 billions (that represents the all-cash buyout price of $23.85 per share). This purchase price premium of 55% was the 4th highest premium paid for a public semiconductor company with greater than $1 billion in value since 2014. The price also represented 18.2 times next twelve month average analyst EBITDA estimates, which was the 4th highest EBITDA multiple paid for a public semiconductor company with a value greater than $1 billion since 2014. The acquisition was announced complete on April 17, 2020, ending the independent history of Cypress Semiconductors.

== See also ==
- SunPower
- List of semiconductor fabrication plants
- List of S&P 400 companies
- Kr00k, vulnerability in some Cypress WiFi chips.
- icDirectory Limited
