= Altera =

U.S. semiconductor company that produces Field-Programmable Gate Arrays (FPGA)

Altera Corporation
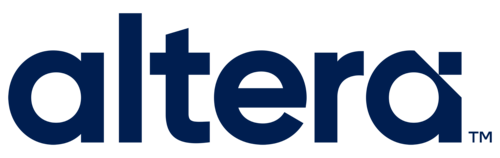

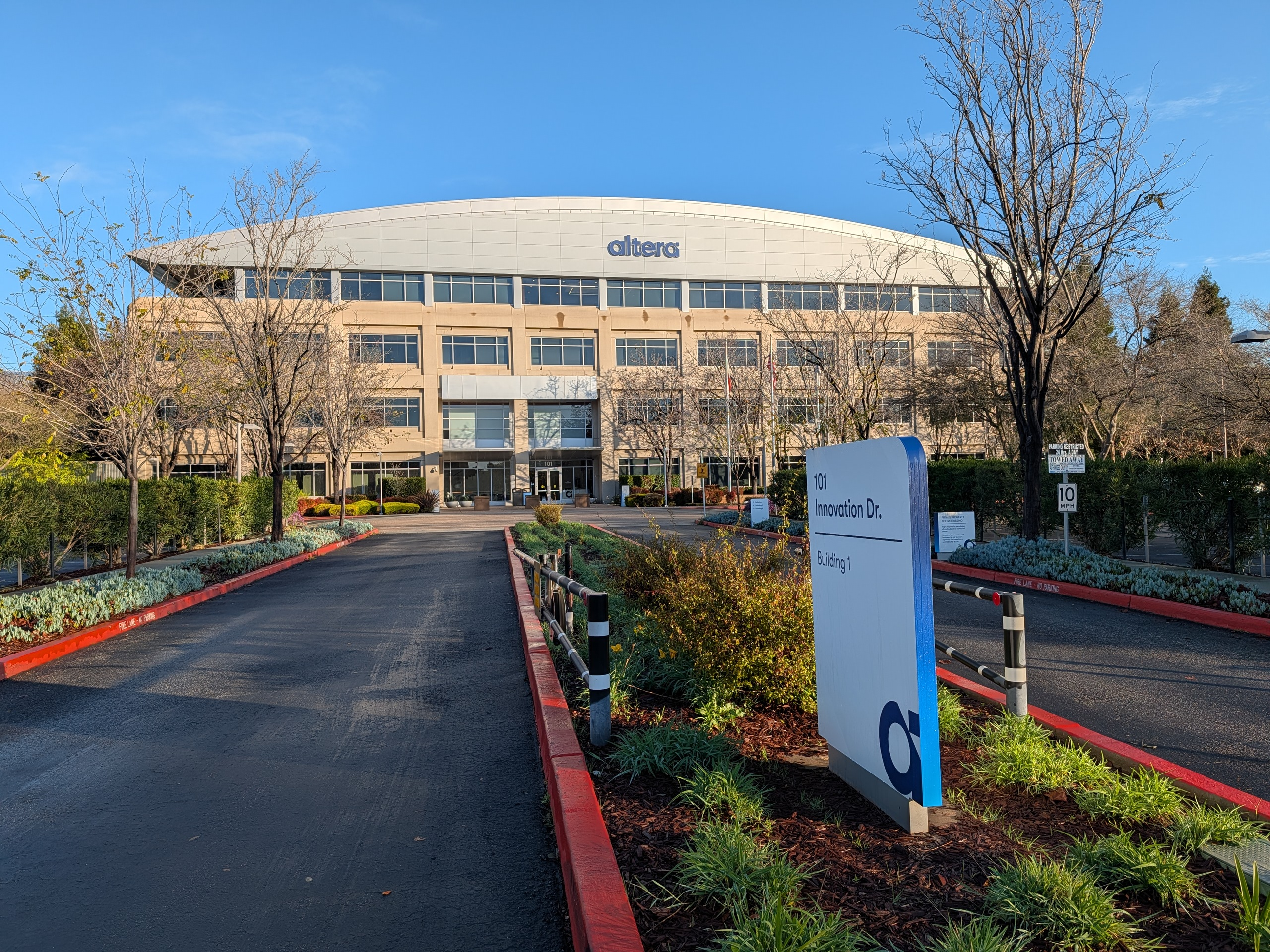
- Altera headquarters in San Jose, California in 2026
- Type: Private
- Traded as: Nasdaq: ALTR (until 2015)
- Industry: Integrated circuits
- Founded: June 1983; 43 years ago
- Founders: Robert Hartmann, Paul Newhagen, James Sansbury, Michael Magranet
- Headquarters: San Jose, California, United States
- Key people: Raghib Hussain (CEO)
- Products: FPGAs, CPLDs, Embedded systems, ASICs
- Revenue: ▲$1.932 billion (2014)
- Net income: ▲$472 million (2014)
- Total assets: ▼$5.674 billion (2014)
- Total equity: ▼$3.285 billion (2014)
- Number of employees: 3,091 (2014)
- Parent: Silver Lake (51%); Intel (49%)
- Website: altera.com

Altera Corporation is a manufacturer of programmable logic devices (PLDs) headquartered in San Jose, California, with a primary focus on field-programmable gate array (FPGA) technology and system-on-a-chip (SoC) FPGAs. Founded in 1983, it was acquired by Intel in 2015, re-established under the Altera name in 2024, and in 2025 became a privately held company majority-owned by private equity firm Silver Lake.

== Early history ==
The company was founded in 1983 by semiconductor veterans Robert Hartmann, Paul Newhagen, James Sansbury, and Michael Magranet with $1,300,000 in seed money. The name of the company was a play on "alterable", the type of chips the company created. The founders selected Rodney Smith to be the company's first CEO. In 1988, Altera became a public company via an initial public offering (IPO).

== Products ==
=== FPGAs ===
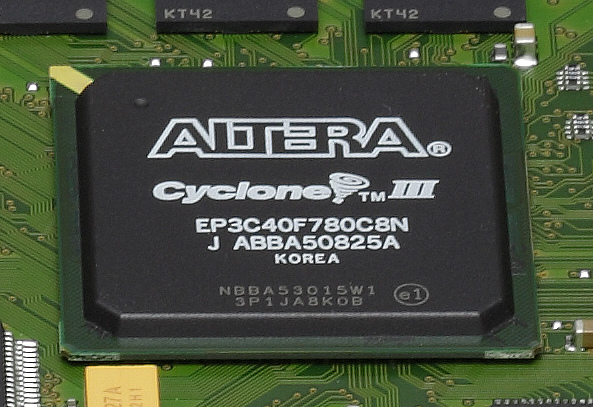
Cyclone III FPGA

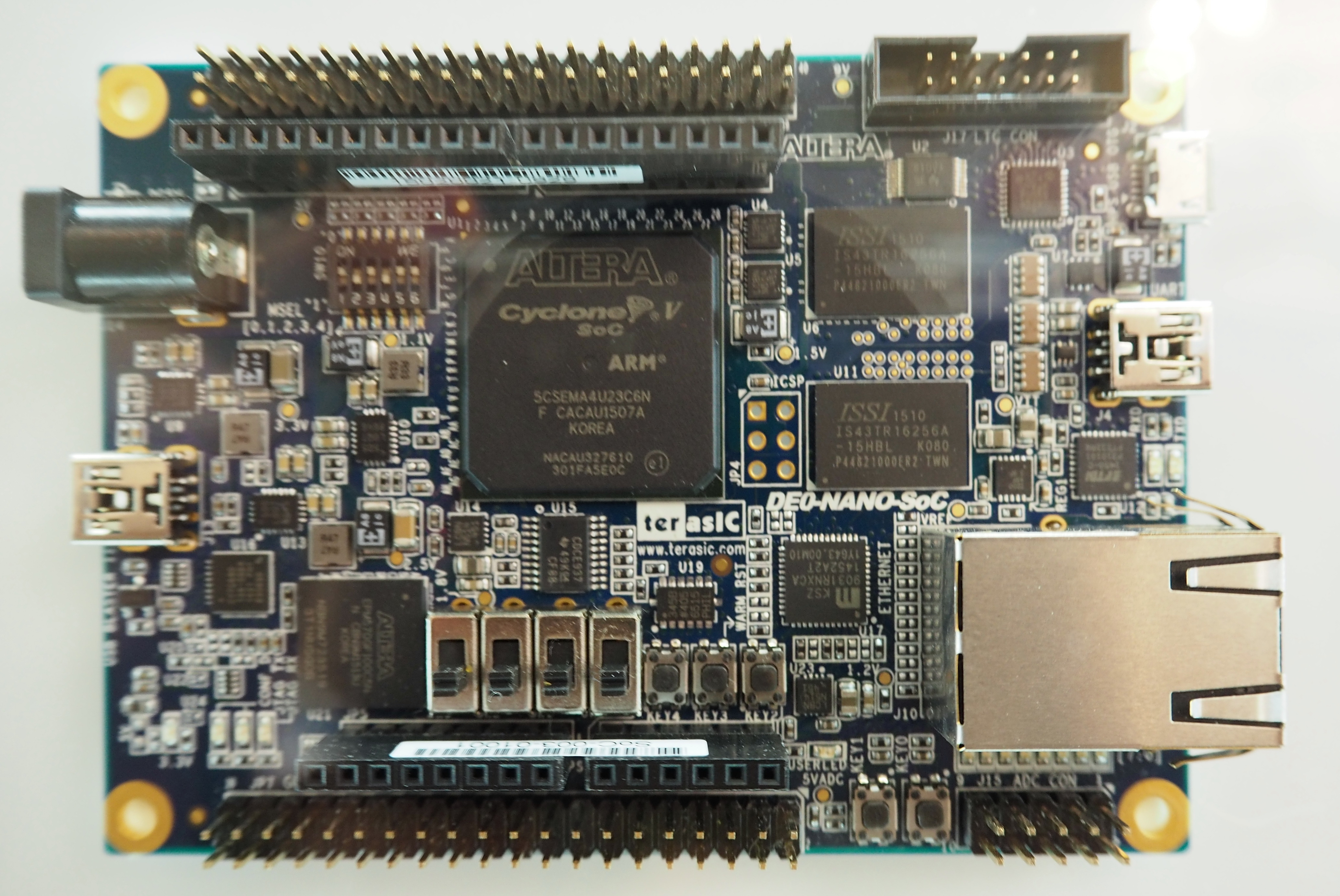
FPGA developer-board with Altera Cyclone V SE FPGA

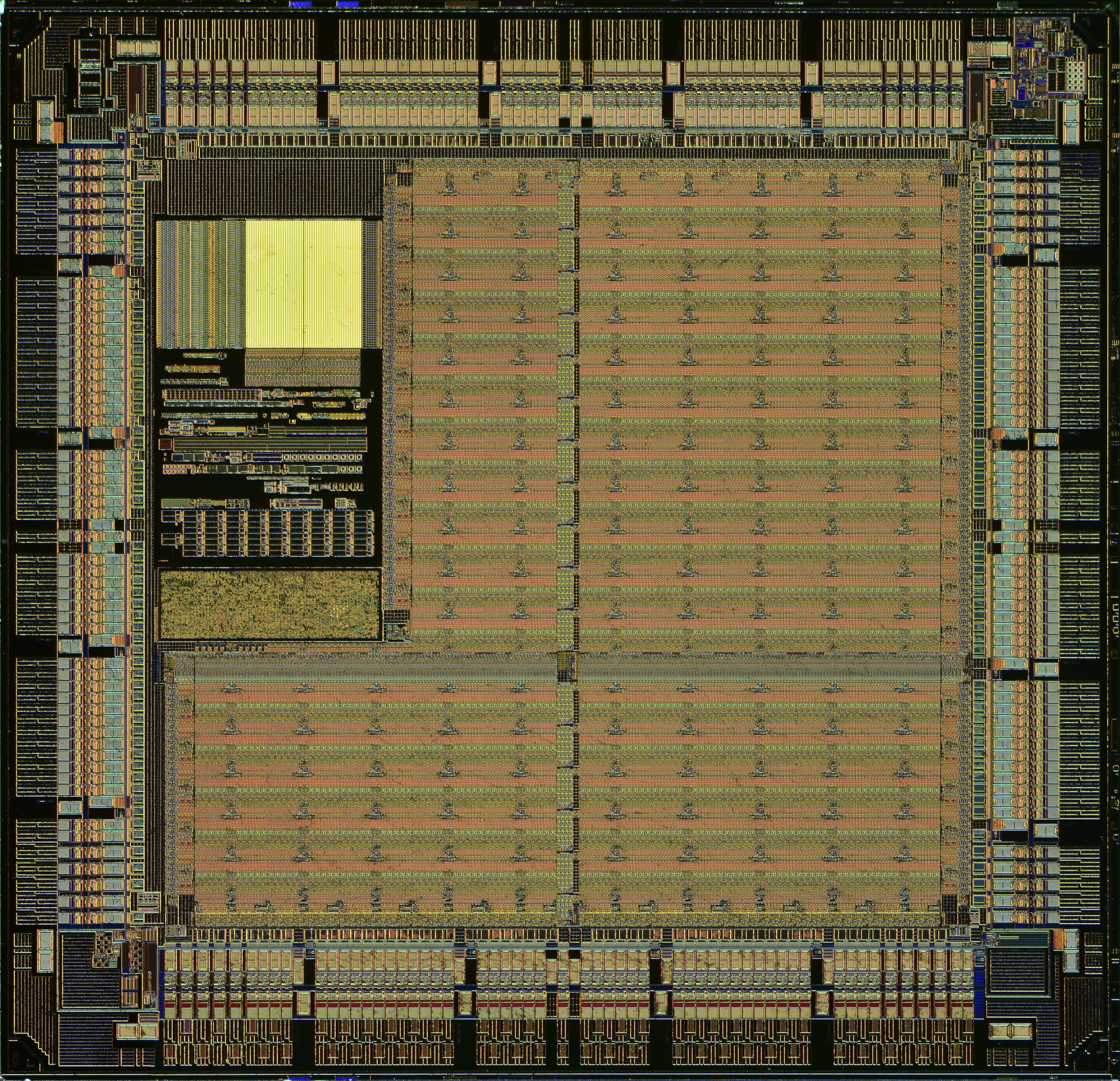
Die shot of an Altera Max II FPGA

The main product lines from Altera are the Agilex FPGA product lines, and their predecessors: the high-end Stratix series, mid-range Arria series, and lower-cost Cyclone series; as well as the MAX series non-volatile FPGAs.

=== Semiconductor intellectual property cores ===
Altera and its partners offer an array of semiconductor intellectual property cores that serve as building blocks that design engineers can drop into their system designs to perform specific functions. IP cores eliminate some of the time-consuming tasks of creating every block in a design from scratch. In 2000, Altera acquired Designpro and Northwest Logic, providers of IP cores, in order to expand its design capabilities and move towards delivery of complete system-on-chip solutions.

=== System on a chip FPGAs ===
Beginning in December 2012, the company announced the shipment of its first system on a chip FPGA devices using a fully depleted silicon on insulator (FDSOI) 28 nm chip manufacturing process. These are the Cyclone V SoC devices, which have a dual-core ARM architecture Cortex-A9 processor system with FPGA logic on a single chip. These devices integrated FPGAs with full hard processor systems based around ARM architecture onto a single device. With these SoCs devices, users were able to create custom field-programmable SoC variants for power, board space, performance and cost optimization.

As of 2026, the majority of Altera's FPGA devices are available as an SoC variant with an ARM hard processor system integrated with the FPGA as a single system on a chip.

Cyclone V SoC, Arria V SoC and Arria 10 SoC product families are system on a chip FPGAs based upon a hard ARM Cortex-A9 dual-core processor system.

Stratix 10 SoC and Agilex 7 SoC product families are system on a chip FPGAs based upon a hard ARM Cortex-A53 quad-core processor system.

The Agilex 5 SoC product family are system on a chip FPGAs based upon a hard ARM Cortex-A76/A55 quad-core processor system.

The Agilex 3 SoC product family are system on a chip FPGAs based upon a hard ARM Cortex-A55 dual-core processor system.

=== Soft Processor cores ===
Altera offers the Nios V embedded soft processor cores based on the RISC-V instruction set architecture. Previously Altera had offered their own proprietary Nios II embedded soft processor, the Freescale ColdFire v1 core, and the ARM Cortex-M1 processor.

=== Design software ===
All of Altera's devices are supported by a common design environment, the Quartus Prime design software, which is a multi-platform development environment that includes various tools needed to design FPGAs, SoC FPGAs, and CPLDs.

In May 2013, Altera made available an SDK for OpenCL, enabling software programmers to access the high-performance capabilities of programmable logic devices.

Altera also supports high-level synthesis using SYCL extensions to ANSI C/C++.

== Intel partnership, acquisition and ownership ==
=== PLD technology licensing partnership ===
In 1984, the company formed a partnership with Intel, licensing its programmable logic technology to Intel. In 1994, Altera acquired the PLD business of Intel for $50 million.

=== Intel 14-nm technology ===
In February 2013, Altera announced an agreement to use Intel's foundry services to produce its 14-nm node for the future manufacturing of its FPGAs, based on Intel's 14-nm tri-gate transistor technology, in place of Altera's ongoing agreement with TSMC. The Stratix 10 product family was the first such product line.

=== Acquisition and ownership by Intel ===
In December 2015, Intel acquired Altera for $16.7 billion in cash. Altera became Intel's newly formed business unit called the Programmable Solutions Group (PSG).

In October 2023, Intel announced that at the start of 2024 it would begin a process of spinning off PSG into a separate company, while maintaining majority ownership and intending to seek an IPO within three years. In February 2024, Intel announced that the newly independent company would reestablish the Altera name and branding, and on January 1, 2025, Altera officially became an independent subsidiary of Intel.

On April 14, 2025, Intel announced that they agreed to sell a 51% controlling stake to Silver Lake, a private equity firm. With this sale, Intel also cancelled their plan to conduct an IPO for the Altera business, since the majority stake is now owned by Silver Lake. It was announced that Raghib Hussain will replace Sandra Rivera as the chief executive officer of Altera, with an effective date of May 5, 2025.

On September 15, 2025, Altera announced that Silver Lake completed the acquisition of a 51% stake in the company, while Intel holds the remaining 49%.

On September 15, 2026, Altera confidentially filed for a US initial public offering, estimated to raise $2 billion, making it one of the largest semiconductor listings since Cerebra's Systems IPO of $5.55 billion in May 2026.

== Restatement of financial results ==
On June 21, 2006, after an investigation by the U.S. Securities and Exchange Commission, the company restated its financial results from 1996 to 2005 to correct accounting errors related to options backdating. The chief financial officer of the company resigned. Altera filed a petition to overturn related regulations but was, under Intel, denied in 2020.

== See also ==
- Xilinx
