= Lattice Semiconductor =

Semiconductor company

Lattice Semiconductor Corporation
- Type: Public
- Traded as: Nasdaq: LSCC; S&P 400 component; Russell 1000 component
- Industry: Semiconductors; Computer hardware; Computer software
- Founded: 1983; 43 years ago
- Headquarters: Hillsboro, Oregon, U.S.45.527216°N 122.926626°W
- Key people: Ford Tamer (CEO)
- Products: FPGAs; CPLDs
- Revenue: ▼US$509 million (2024)
- Operating income: ▼US$34 million (2024)
- Net income: ▼US$61 million (2024)
- Total assets: ▲US$843 million (2024)
- Total equity: ▲US$710 million (2024)
- Number of employees: 1,110 (2024)
- Website: latticesemi.com

Lattice Semiconductor Corporation is an American semiconductor company specializing in the design and manufacturing of low-power field-programmable gate arrays (FPGAs). Headquartered in the Silicon Forest area of Hillsboro, Oregon, the company also has operations in San Jose, California, Shanghai, Manila, Penang, Singapore and Pune. Lattice Semiconductor has more than 1,000 employees and an annual revenue of $509 million as of 2024. The company was founded in 1983 and went public in 1989. It is traded on the Nasdaq stock exchange under the symbol LSCC.

Lattice Semiconductor at 9th Bengaluru Space Expo 2026, BIEC

== History ==
=== Founding and early growth ===
Lattice was founded on April 3, 1983, by C. Norman Winningstad, Rahul Sud, and Ray Capece, with investment from Winningstad, Harry Merlo, Tom Moyer, and John Piacentini. Lattice was incorporated in Oregon in 1983 and reincorporated in Delaware in 1985. Co-founder Sud left as president in December 1986, and Winningstad left in 1991 as chairman of the board. Early struggles led to chapter 11 bankruptcy reorganization in July 1987. The company emerged from bankruptcy after 62 days and moved from its headquarters in an unincorporated area near Beaverton to a smaller building in Hillsboro, Oregon. Over the next year, the company shrank from 140 to 64 employees but posted record revenues.

Cyrus Tsui became the company's chief executive officer in 1988. On November 9, 1989, Lattice became a publicly traded company when its shares were listed on the NASDAQ after an initial public offering. The initial share price was $6, and raised almost $14 million for the company. In July 1990, a second stock offering of nearly 1.5 million new shares raised $22.6 million at $16.25 per share.

In 1995, the company attempted to assert trademark rights in the term Silicon Forest beyond the use of its trademark for the use in semiconductor devices. It had registered the mark in 1985, but later conceded it could not prevent the usage of the term as a noun. Forbes ranked the company as their 162nd best small company in the United States in 1996, and Lattice began to double the size of its Hillsboro headquarters.

In 2000, annual revenues topped $560 million with profits of $160 million. Its stock price reached an all-time high of $41.34, adjusted for splits. For the next five years, however, the company recorded no annual profit.

=== Acquisitions and leadership changes ===
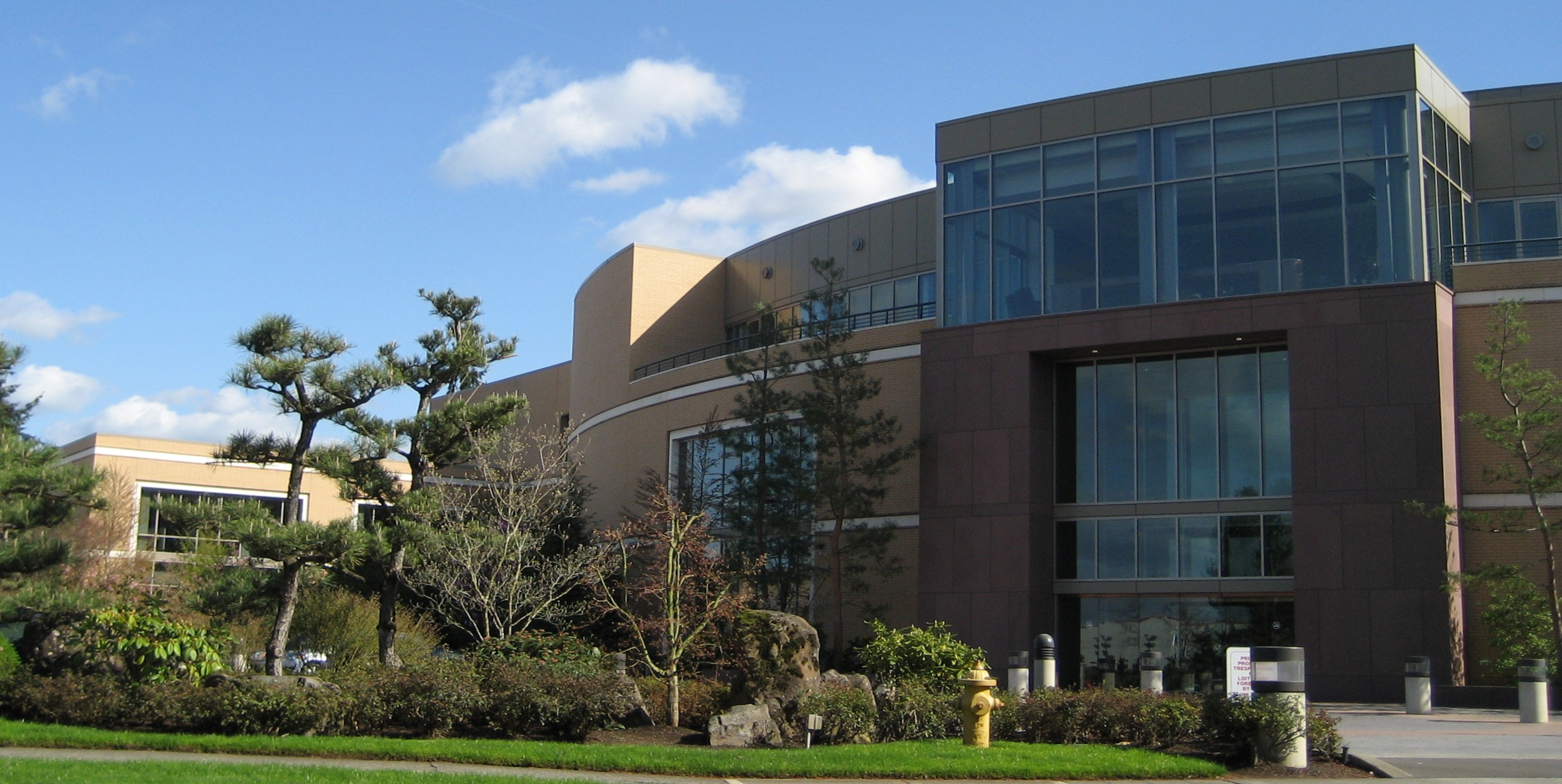
Former company headquarters in Portland, Oregon

On March 19, 2001, Lattice acquired Integrated Intellectual Property, Inc. (I2P), a semiconductor intellectual property (IP) company headquartered in Santa Clara, California. This move strengthened Lattice's internal intellectual property development programs and marked I2P's successful exit as one of the early pure-play semiconductor IP firms of the dot-com era.

Lattice purchased Agere Corporation's FPGA division in 2002. In 2004, the company settled charges with the United States government that it had illegally exported certain technologies to China, paying a fine of $560,000. In 2005, Tsui was replaced as CEO by Steve Skaggs and the company laid off employees for the first time. In fiscal year 2006, Lattice posted a profit of $3.1 million on revenues of $245.5 million, the first annual profit since 2000.

In June 2008, Bruno Guilmart was named as chief executive officer of the company, replacing Steve Skaggs. For fiscal year 2008, Lattice had a loss of $32 million on annual revenues of $222.3 million. In 2009, the company began moving all of its warehouse operations for parts from Oregon to Singapore. Through July 2009, the company had lost money for ten straight quarters, and had its first profitable quarter in three years during the fourth quarter of 2009. Bruno Guilmart left the company in August 2010, and Darin Billerbeck, former Zilog CEO, who had just sold Zilog in the previous year, was named the new CEO in October of that year, starting in November. The company reported 2011 revenue of $318 million. Lattice started a stock buy-back program in 2010 that continued into 2012 that would total about $35 million if fully implemented.

In 2011, the company was ranked third among the world's makers of field programmable gate array (FPGA) devices and second for CPLDs & SPLDs. On December 9, 2011, Lattice announced it was acquiring SiliconBlue for $63.2 million in cash. Lattice announced in July 2012 a foundry agreement with United Microelectronics Corporation. Lattice returned to profitability in 2013 with a profit of $22.3 million on $332.5 million in revenues. The company acquired Silicon Image Inc. for $606 million in March 2015 and moved company headquarters to downtown Portland.

=== Activity since 2016 ===
In April 2016, Tsinghua Holdings said in a U.S. filing that it accumulated a roughly 6 percent stake in Lattice Semiconductor through share purchased on the open market. In November 2016, Canyon Bridge Capital Partners, a private equity firm backed by China Reform Holdings Corporation announced a definitive agreement to acquire all of Lattice's shares. The purchase of Lattice by Canyon Bridge was in September 2017 blocked by US President Donald Trump based on the recommendation of the Committee on Foreign Investment in the United States on national security grounds under the Exon–Florio Amendment. The company re-located its headquarters back to its Hillsboro campus in 2019.

Activist investor Lion Point Capital purchased a six percent stake in Lattice in February 2018. The next month the company filled three new seats on its board with independent directors supported by Lion Point. That same year, Lattice replaced several members of its leadership team, including bringing in a new president and CEO, Jim Anderson, who previously worked at Advanced Micro Devices. Under the new leadership, Lattice shifted the company's focus entirely to low-power FPGAs. Lattice acquired computer vision software company Mirametrix in November 2021.

Jim Anderson left Lattice in June 2024, at which time Lattice Chief Strategy and Marketing Officer Esam Elashmawi was appointed Interim CEO. On September 16, 2024, Lattice named Ford Tamer as CEO.

On May 5, 2026, Lattice announced it had signed a definitive agreement to acquire American Megatrends (AMI), a provider of platform firmware and infrastructure manageability, for $1.65 billion in a combination of cash and stock.

== Products ==
Lattice primarily focuses on small, efficient low-power field-programmable gate arrays (FPGAs). It also sells programmable mixed-signal and interconnect products, related software and intellectual property (IP), for applications from edge computing to cloud computing. Lattice's main products are those based on its Lattice Nexus small FPGA platform and Lattice Avant mid-range FPGA platform. Lattice products are used in a variety of end uses across the communication, computing (client and datacenter), industrial, automotive, and consumer electronics markets.

Lattice's software offerings include design tools Diamond, Radiant, and Propel. It also provides solution stacks designed to provide its customers with application-specific toolkits to help them more easily and quickly design with Lattice technology. As of 2023, these include Lattice mVision, designed for machine vision in power-constrained designs; Lattice sensAI, designed to integrate machine learning into internet of things applications; Lattice Automate, designed to facilitate industrial applications like robotics and real-time networking in settings like automated factories and warehouses; Lattice Sentry, for security; and Lattice Drive for automotive applications.

== Operations ==
The company is headquartered in Hillsboro, Oregon, in the high-tech area known as the Silicon Forest. The company employs more than 1000 people worldwide as of 2023. Ford Tamer is Lattice's chief executive officer. Its chief competitors are Xilinx (a subsidiary of AMD) and Altera. After AMD completed the acquisition of Xilinx in February 2022, Lattice Semiconductor became the last fully independent major manufacturer of FPGAs.

== See also ==
- List of companies based in Oregon
