= Electronic system-level design and verification =

Electronic system level (ESL) design and verification is an electronic design methodology, focused on higher abstraction level concerns. The term Electronic System Level or ESL Design was first defined by Gartner Dataquest, an EDA-industry-analysis firm, on February 1, 2001. It is defined in ESL Design and Verification as: "the utilization of appropriate abstractions in order to increase comprehension about a system, and to enhance the probability of a successful implementation of functionality in a cost-effective manner."

The basic premise is to model the behavior of the entire system using a low-level language such as C, C++, or using graphical "model-based" design tools. Newer languages are emerging that enable the creation of a model at a higher level of abstraction including general purpose system design languages like SysML as well as those that are specific to embedded system design like SMDL and SSDL. Rapid and correct-by-construction implementation of the system can be automated using EDA tools such as high-level synthesis and embedded software tools, although much of it is performed manually today. ESL can also be accomplished through the use of SystemC as an abstract modeling language.

ESL is an established approach at many of the world’s leading System-on-a-chip (SoC) design companies, and is being used increasingly in system design. From its genesis as an algorithm modeling methodology with 'no links to implementation', ESL is evolving into a set of complementary methodologies that enable embedded system design, verification, and debugging through to the hardware and software implementation of custom SoC, system-on-FPGA, system-on board, and entire multi-board systems.

Design and verification are two distinct disciplines within this methodology. Some practices are to keep the two elements separate, while others advocate for closer integration between design and verification.

== Design ==
Whether ESL or other systems, design refers to "the concurrent design of the hardware and software parts of an electronic product."

== Tools ==
There are various types of EDA tool used for ESL design. The key component is the Virtual Platform which is essentially a simulator. The Virtual Platform most commonly supports Transaction-level modeling (TLM), where operations of one component on another are modelled with a simple method call between the objects modelling each component. This abstraction gives a considerable speed up over cycle-accurate modelling, since thousands of net-level events in the real system can be represented by simply passing a pointer, e.g. to model that an Ethernet packet has been received, SystemC is often used.

Other tools support import and export or intercommunication with components modelled at other levels of abstraction. For instance, an RTL component be converted into a SystemC model using VtoC or Verilator. And High Level Synthesis can be used to convert C models of a component into an RTL implementation.

== Verification ==
In ESL design and verification, verification testing is used to prove the integrity of the design of the system or device. Numerous verification techniques may be applied; these test methods are usually modified or customized to better accommodate the system or device under test. Common ESL verification methods include, but are not limited to:

- Modular architecture
- Constrained random stimulus generation
- Error injection
- Complete simulation environments

Verification is often provided by the system/device designer, but in many instances, additional independent verification is required

== Challenges and criticism ==
Some criticisms of ESL design and verification have been raised. These include too much focus on C-based languages and challenges in representing parallel processes. It can also be argued that ESL design and verification is a subset of verification and validation.

== See also ==
- High-level synthesis
- High-level verification
- Electronic design automation
- List of free and open-source EDA software
- Platform-based design
- Integrated circuit design
- Register-transfer level
- Property Specification Language
- Virtual prototyping
- SystemC
- SystemC AMS
- Systems engineering
- SystemVerilog
- Transaction-level modeling (TLM)
