= Code generation =

In computing, code generation denotes software techniques or systems that generate executable code which may then be used independently of the generator system in a runtime environment.

Specific articles:

- Code generation (compiler), a mechanism to produce the executable form of computer programs, such as machine code, in some automatic manner
- Automatic programming (source code generation), the act of generating source code based on an ontological model such as a template
- Generating code at run time in self-modifying code and just-in-time compilation
- Model-driven development uses graphical models and metamodels as basis for generating programs
- Program synthesis consists of synthesizing programs from a high-level, typically declarative specification
- Random test generators are used in functional verification of microprocessors
- Comparison of code generation tools shows the diversity of tools and approaches for code generation
