= M. Wolf =

M. Wolf can refer to:

- Maximilian Franz Joseph Cornelius Wolf (1863-1932), a German astronomer, better known as Max Wolf
- Marek Wolf, a Czech astronomer, currently with the Astronomical Institute, Univerzita Karlova v Praze (Charles University).
- Marilyn Wolf, American computer engineer
