= COSEDA Technologies =

German software development company

COSEDA Technologies GmbH
- Company type: Private
- Industry: Electronic design automation
- Founded: 2015
- Headquarters: Dresden, Germany
- Products: COSIDE IDE
- Website: coseda-tech.com

The COSEDA Technologies GmbH is a software development company located in Dresden, Germany that was founded in 2015 as a spin-off from the Fraunhofer Institute or Integrated Circuits IIS, Division Engineering of Adaptive Systems EAS, one of the largest research institutions in the field of design automation in Europe.

The Company's design environment COSIDE, is the first commercially available design environment based on SystemC as well as on SystemC AMS standards. The company also provides the only publicly available proof of concept to the SystemC AMS-Standard IEEE 1666.1-2016.

== See also ==
- SystemC AMS
- SystemC
