= HLV =

HLV may refer to:

- Heavy-lift launch vehicle, in spaceflight
- High-level verification, in electronics
- H-L-V School District, Iowa, United States
- Venezuelan Standard Time (Spanish: Hora Legal de Venezuela)
- Holland Village MRT station, Singapore
