= C Level Design =

American computer software company

- Type: Private
- Industry: Electronic design automation
- Predecessor: CompiLogic
- Founded: 1996; 30 years ago
- Founder: Don Soderman; Denis Coleman; Yuri Panchul
- Defunct: November 12, 2001
- Fate: Acquired
- Successor: Synopsys
- Headquarters: San Jose, California, U.S.
- Products: C2Verilog; CycleC
- Number of employees: 30 (2001)
- Website: www.synopsys.com

C Level Design was an American computer software company based in San Jose, California. It developed a tools to translate from the C programming language to hardware description languages.

The company was established in 1996 by Don Soderman, Denis Coleman and Yuri Panchul. The first product was called C2Verilog. Originally called CompiLogic Corporation, its name was changed in December 1998.

Networking and telecom companies including Nortel, Alcatel, Sony, Boeing, Compaq and Fujitsu used C Level's System Compiler design environment. Using a C2Verilog tool, Hitachi developed a rough concept of five-stage, 8-bit microcontroller in about three weeks. C2Verilog was used by the NASA Jet Propulsion Lab in Pasadena, California.

At its height, C Level employed 30 people. The company had about $3 million in accumulated revenue over several years.

In June 2000, Altera announced an investment in the company. In March 2001, the company announced it would donate its CycleC technology to the Open SystemC Initiative. However, the transfer never took place; in November 2001, the company ceased operation. Synopsys acquired its assets and integrated CycleC simulation methodology into Synopsys' VCS Verilog simulator, and discontinued other C Level products. C Level's synthesis technology included at least one patent.
