= Marilyn Wolf =

American computer engineer

- Born: Marilyn Claire Wolf; April 12, 1958 (age 68)
- Education: Stanford University (BS, MS, PhD)
- Occupations: Computer engineer, Professor
- Employer(s): University of Nebraska–Lincoln (2019–present); Georgia Institute of Technology (2007–2019); Princeton University (1989–2007); AT&T Bell Laboratories (1984–1989)
- Known for: Embedded systems, Cyber-physical systems, Hardware/software co-design
- Title: Director for Engineering and Technology Initiatives (UNL)
- Awards: Marie R. Pistilli Women in Electronic Design Award (2025); IEEE Leon K. Kirchmayer Graduate Teaching Award (2022); IEEE Computer Society Harry H. Goode Memorial Award (2019); ASEE Terman Award (2003)
- Website: mwolf.unl.edu

Marilyn Claire Wolf (born April 12, 1958) is an American computer engineer who works as Elmer E. Koch Professor of Engineering and Founding Director of the School of Computing at the University of Nebraska–Lincoln. She is an expert in embedded computing. She has also written 9 books about computer science.

== Education and career ==
Wolf attended Stanford University, earning a bachelor's degree there in 1980, a master's degree in 1981, and a doctorate in 1984. After working at Bell Labs from 1984 to 1989, she joined the Princeton University faculty, and was on the Georgia Tech faculty from 2007 to 2019. At Georgia Tech, she was the Rhesa "Ray" S. Farmer, Jr., Distinguished Chair in Embedded Computing Systems and Georgia Research Alliance Eminent Scholar.

From 1999 to 2000, Wolf was editor-in-chief of IEEE Transactions on Very Large Scale Integration Systems, and from 2001 to 2007, Wolf was editor-in-chief of ACM Transactions on Embedded Computing. She is the author of the textbooks Computers as Components: Principles of Embedded Computing System Design (3rd ed., Elsevier, 2012) and High Performance Embedded Computing (2nd ed., Morgan Kaufmann, 2014).

== Recognition ==
In 1998, she was elected as a Fellow of the Institute of Electrical and Electronics Engineers, and in 2001 she was elected as a Fellow of the Association for Computing Machinery "for contributions to embedded computing." In 2018, Marilyn Wolf became a literal action figure. As part of a project to encourage girls in STEM, she was featured in a collection of figurines of prominent female scientists and engineers. She received the IEEE Computer Society Harry H. Goode Memorial Award in 2019 for contributions to embedded, hardware-software co-design, and real-time computer vision systems. She received the IEEE Leon K. Kirchmayer Graduate Teaching Award in 2022 for her inspirational teaching of graduate students.
