= Daniel Gajski =

American computer scientist

Daniel Gajski is a Professor of the School of Information and Computer Science and the School of Engineering at University of California, Irvine, United States. He was previously the Director for the Center for Embedded Computer Systems (CECS), now known as the Center for Embedded and Cyber-physical Systems.

After 10 years of industrial experience in Europe and the United States in digital circuits, telecommunication systems, supercomputer design, and VLSI structures, he spent 10 years in academia with the Department of Computer Science at the University of Illinois at Urbana-Champaign. His research interests include embedded systems and information technology, design methodologies, specification languages and CAD software, and the science of design.

In 1994, Daniel Gajski became an IEEE fellow for his work in VLSD, CAD tools, and system level design methodology.

On January 10, 2010, the European Design and Automation Association (EDAA) announced that the EDAA Lifetime Achievement Award goes to Dr. Daniel Gajski. This award is given to individuals who have made outstanding contributions to the state of the art in electronic design, automation and testing of electronic systems in their life.

== Selected books ==
- D. D. Gajski, S. Abdi, A. Gerstlauer, and G. Schirner, Embedded System Design: Modeling, Synthesis, Verification, Springer, ISBN 978-1-4419-0503-1, July 2009.
- A. Gerstlauer, R. Doemer, J. Peng, D. D. Gajski, System Design: A Practical Guide with SpecC, Kluwer Academic Publishers, Boston, MA, ISBN 0-7923-7387-1, June 2001.
- D. D. Gajski, J. Zhu, R. Doemer, A. Gerstlauer, S. Zhao, SpecC: Specification Language and Methodology, Japanese Edition, CQ Publishing, Japan, ISBN 4-7898-3353-4, December 2000, 328 pages.
- D. D. Gajski, J. Zhu, R. Doemer, A. Gerstlauer, S. Zhao, SpecC: Specification Language and Methodology, Kluwer Academic Publishers, Boston, MA, ISBN 0-7923-7822-9, March 2000, 336 pages.
- D. D. Gajski, Principles of Digital Design, Prentice Hall, Upper Saddle River, NJ, ISBN 978-0-13-301144-9, September 1996, 450 pages.

== See also ==
- Gajski-Kuhn chart
- SpecC
