= Gate equivalent =

Measure of circuit complexity

A gate equivalent (GE) stands for a unit of measure which allows specifying manufacturing-technology-independent complexity of digital electronic circuits. For today's CMOS technologies, the silicon area of a two-input drive-strength-one NAND gate usually constitutes the technology-dependent unit area commonly referred to as gate equivalent. A specification in gate equivalents for a certain circuit reflects a complexity measure, from which a corresponding silicon area can be deduced for a dedicated manufacturing technology.

In digital circuit design, a dedicated standard cell library is employed for each manufacturing technology (e.g., CMOS). The standard cell library comprises many different logic gates, for example a NAND gate. For each logical type of logic gate, e.g., a two-input NAND, there usually exist different physical realizations in the standard cell library, for instance with different output drive strengths.

Basically, a two-input drive-strength-one NAND gate in CMOS technology consists of four transistors.

== See also ==
- Logic family
- NMOS logic
- MOSFET
- Fanout
- FO4
- Boolean logic
