= SystemC AMS =

SystemC AMS is an extension to SystemC for analog, mixed-signal and RF functionality. The SystemC AMS 2.0 standard was released on April 6, 2016 as IEEE Std 1666.1-2016.

== Language features ==
=== MoC - Model of Computation ===
A model of computation (MoC) is a set of rules defining the behavior and interaction between SystemC AMS primitive modules. SystemC AMS defines the following models of computation: timed data flow (TDF), linear signal flow (LSF) and electrical linear networks (ELN).

==== TDF - Timed Data Flow ====
In the timed data flow (TDF) model, components exchange analogue values with each other on a periodic basis at a chosen sampling rate, such as every 10 microseconds. By the sampling theorem, this would be sufficient to convey signals of up to 50 MHz bandwidth without aliasing artefacts. A TDF model defines a method called processing() that is invoked at the appropriate rate as simulation time advances. A so-called cluster of models share a static schedule of when they should communicate. This sets the relative ordering of the calls to the processing() methods of each TDF instance in the cluster. The periodic behaviour of TDF allows it to operate independently of the main SystemC event-driven kernel used for digital logic.

==== ELN - Electrical Linear Networks ====
The SystemC electrical linear networks (ELN) library provides a set of standard electrical components that enable SPICE-like simulations to be run. The three basic components, resistors, capacitors and inductors are, of course, available. Further voltage-controlled variants, such as a transconductance amplifier (voltage-controlled current generator) enable most FET and other semiconductor models to be readily created.

Current flowing in ELN networks of resistors can be solved with a suitable simultaneous equation solver. These are called the nodal equations. Where time-varying components, such as capacitors and inductors are included, Euler's method is typically implemented to model them. Euler's method is a simple approach to solving finite-difference time-domain (FDTD) problems. For instance, to simulate the capacitor charge problem on the left below, a timestep delta\_t is selected that is typically about one percent of the time constant and the iteration on the bottom right is executed.

The error in Euler's method decreases quadratically with smaller time steps, but an overly-small time step results in a slow simulation for a complex finite-element simulation. But this is not a problem in many situations where part of a complex SoC or plant controller is run alongside a plant model that has just a few state variables, such as the car transmission system because there are orders of magnitude difference in time constants (e.g. 100 MHz clock versus 1~ms shortest inertial time constant). Simulating the analogue subsystem inside the RTL simulator then makes sense. Moreover, most plant control situations use closed-loop negative feedback with the controller being just as good at managing a slightly errored plant model as the real model.

Under the ELN formalism, the SystemC initialisation and simulation cycles are extended to support solving nodal flow equations. Nodal equation solving is generally solved iteratively rather than using direct methods such as Gaussian Elimination or based on matrix inverses. Iterative methods tend to have greater stability and are fast when the state has only advanced slightly from the previous time step. When the kernel de-queues a time-advancing event from the event queue, the simulation time is advanced. The analogue part of the simulator maintains a time quantum beyond which the nodal equations need to be re-computed. This quantum is dynamically adjusted depending on the behaviour of the equations. If the equations are `bendy', meaning that linear extrapolation using Euler's method over the quantum will lead to too much error, the time step is reduced, otherwise it can be gradually enlarged at each step. Overall, two forms of iteration are needed: the first is iteration at a time step to solve the nodal equations to a sufficient accuracy. The second is between time steps. In a simple implementation, once simulation time has advanced beyond the Euler quantum, the analogue sub-system is re-solved. If the extrapolation errors are too great, the simulator must go back to the last time step and simulate forward again using a smaller analogue quantum. This mechanism is also the basis for SPICE simulations. Each analogue variable that is the argument to a `cross', or other analogue sensitivity, is then examined to see if new digital domain work has been triggered. If so, new events are injected on the discrete event queue for the current simulation time.

==== LSF - Linear Signal Flow ====
The SystemC linear signal flow (LSF) library provides a set of primitive analogue operators, such as adders and differentiators that enable all basic structures found in differential equations to be constructed in a self-documenting and executable form. The advantage of constructing the system from a standard operator library is that `reflection' is possible: other code can analyse the structure and perform analytic differentiation, summation, integration and other forms of analysis, such as sensitivity analysis to determine a good time step. This would not be possible for an implementation using ad-hoc coding. In general programming, reflection refers to a program being able to read its own source code.

=== Ports ===
TDF in/outport definition:

 sca_tdf::sca_in<PortType>
 sca_tdf::sca_out<PortType>

TDF converter in/outport definition:

 sca_tdf::sc_in<PortType>  // DE → TDF inport
 sca_tdf::sc_out<PortType> // TDF → DE outport

ELN terminal definition:

 sca_eln::sca_terminal

=== Nodes ===
 sca_eln::sca_node         // ELN node
 sca_eln::sca_node_ref     // ELN reference node

=== Cluster ===
 ToDo: description

=== Tracing ===
sca_trace_file *tf = sca_create_tabular_trace_file("trace_file_name.dat");
  sca_trace(tf, <PORT|SIGNAL|NODE>, "name");

== Example code ==
=== TDF ===
Timed-Data-Flow 1st order low pass model:

#include <systemc-ams>

using namespace sca_util;        // introduced for convenience: sca_util::sca_vector<TYPE> → sca_vector<TYPE>
using namespace sca_core;        // introduced for convenience: sca_core::sca_time() → sca_time()
using namespace sca_ac_analysis; // introduced for convenience: sca_ac_analysis::sca_ac() → sca_ac()

SCA_TDF_MODULE(tdf_low_pass)
{
    // TDF ports
    sca_tdf::sca_in<double>  inp;
    sca_tdf::sca_out<double> outp;

    // parameters
    double fcut;                 // cut-off frequency

    // methods
    void initialize();           // simulator callback for initialization purpose
    void ac_processing();        // simulator callback for AC behavior implementation
    void processing();           // simulator callback for time implementation

    // constructor
    SCA_CTOR(tdf_low_pass) {
    	fcut = 1.0e3;            // cut-off frequency 1kHz
    }

private:
    sca_vector<double > num;	 // numerator coefficients
    sca_vector<double > den;	 // de-numerator coefficients
    sca_vector<double > state;   // state vector
    sca_tdf::sca_ltf_nd ltf_nd;  // linear transfer function (numerator/de-numerator type)
};

linear transfer function: $H(s) = \frac{1}{1+\frac{1}{2*\pi*f_\mathrm{cut}}s}$

// initialize linear transfer function coefficients
void tdf_low_pass::initialize(){
  num(0) = 1.0;
  den(0) = 1.0;
  den(1) = 1.0/(2.0*M_PI*fcut);
}

ToDo: description

// AC implementation
void tdf_low_pass::ac_processing(){
  sca_ac(outp) = sca_ac_ltf_nd(num, den, sca_ac(inp));
}

ToDo: description

// time domain implementation
void tdf_low_pass::processing(){
  outp = ltf_nd(num, den, state, inp);
}

=== ELN ===
Electrical-Linear-Networks 1st order low pass netlist:

SC_MODULE(eln_low_pass_netlist)
{
    // sca eln terminals
    sca_eln::sca_terminal n1;
    sca_eln::sca_terminal n2;

    // internal nodes
    sca_eln::sca_node_ref gnd;

    // eln modules
    sca_eln::sca_r i_r;
    sca_eln::sca_c i_c;

    SC_CTOR(eln_low_pass_netlist) : i_r("i_r"), i_c("i_c")
    {
          i_r.value = 1.0;
          i_r.p.bind(n1);
          i_r.n.bind(n2);

          i_c.value = 1.0/(2.0*M_PI*1.0e3);
          i_c.p.bind(n2);
          i_c.n.bind(gnd);
    }
};

=== LSF ===
Linear-Signal-Flow netlist:

== History ==
SystemC AMS study group was founded in 2002 to develop and maintain analog and mixed-signal extensions to SystemC, and to initiate an OSCI (Open SystemC initiative) SystemC-AMS working group. The study group has made initial investigations and specified and implemented a SystemC extension to demonstrate feasibility of the approach. In 2006, a SystemC AMS working group has been funded which continued the work of the study group inside OSCI, and now goes on to work on SystemC AMS within the Accellera Systems Initiative, resulting in the AMS 1.0 standard in 2010. After the release of the Accellera SystemC AMS 2.0 standard in 2013, the standard was transferred to the IEEE Standards Association in 2014 for further industry adoption and maintenance. The SystemC AMS standard was released April 6, 2016 as IEEE Std 1666.1-2016. COSEDA Technologies provides with COSIDE the first commercially available design environment based on SystemC AMS standard.

- SystemC AMS-Standard IEEE 1666.1-2016
- SystemC AMS Proof-of-Concept Download
