= High-level synthesis =

Creation of hardware designs from software code

High-level synthesis (HLS), sometimes referred to as C synthesis, electronic system-level (ESL) synthesis, algorithmic synthesis, or behavioral synthesis, is an automated design process that takes an abstract behavioral specification of a digital system and finds a register-transfer level structure that realizes the given behavior.

Synthesis begins with a high-level specification of the problem, where behavior is generally decoupled from low-level circuit mechanics such as clock-level timing. Early HLS explored a variety of input specification languages, although recent research and commercial applications generally accept synthesizable subsets of ANSI C/C++/SystemC/MATLAB. The code is analyzed, architecturally constrained, and scheduled to transcompile from a transaction-level model (TLM) into a register-transfer level (RTL) design in a hardware description language (HDL), which is in turn commonly synthesized to the gate level by the use of a logic synthesis tool.

The goal of HLS is to let hardware designers efficiently build and verify hardware, by giving them better control over optimization of their design architecture, and through the nature of allowing the designer to describe the design at a higher level of abstraction while the tool does the RTL implementation. Verification of the RTL is an important part of the process.

Hardware can be designed at varying levels of abstraction. The commonly used levels of abstraction are gate level, register-transfer level (RTL), and algorithmic level.

While logic synthesis uses an RTL description of the design, high-level synthesis works at a higher level of abstraction, starting with an algorithmic description in a high-level language such as SystemC and ANSI C/C++. The designer typically develops the module functionality and the interconnect protocol. The high-level synthesis tools handle the micro-architecture and transform untimed or partially timed functional code into fully timed RTL implementations, automatically creating cycle-by-cycle detail for hardware implementation. The (RTL) implementations are then used directly in a conventional logic synthesis flow to create a gate-level implementation.

== History ==
Early academic work extracted scheduling, allocation, and binding as the basic steps for high-level-synthesis. Scheduling partitions the algorithm in control steps that are used to define the states in the finite-state machine. Each control step contains one small section of the algorithm that can be performed in a single clock cycle in the hardware. Allocation and binding maps the instructions and variables to the hardware components, multiplexers, registers and wires of the data path.

First generation behavioral synthesis was introduced by Synopsys in 1994 as Behavioral Compiler and used Verilog or VHDL as input languages. The abstraction level used was partially timed (clocked) processes. Tools based on behavioral Verilog or VHDL were not widely adopted in part because neither languages nor the partially timed abstraction were well suited to modeling behavior at a high level. 10 years later, in early 2004, Synopsys end-of-lifed Behavioral Compiler.

Forte Design Systems introduced its Cynthesizer tool which used SystemC as an entry language instead of Verilog or VHDL. Cynthesizer was adopted by many Japanese companies in 2000 as Japan had a very mature SystemC user community. The first high-level synthesis tapeout was achieved in 2001 by Sony using Cynthesizer. Adoption in the United States started in earnest in 2008.

In 2006, an efficient and scalable "SDC modulo scheduling" technique was developed on control and data flow graphs and was later extended to pipeline scheduling. This technique uses the integer linear programming formulation. But it shows that the underlying constraint matrix is totally unimodular (after approximating the resource constraints). Thus, the problem can be solved in polynomial time optimally using a linear programming solver in polynomial time. This work was inducted to the FPGA and Reconfigurable Computing Hall of Fame 2022.

The SDC scheduling algorithm was implemented in the xPilot HLS system developed at UCLA, and later licensed to the AutoESL Design Technologies, a spin-off from UCLA. AutoESL was acquired by Xilinx (now part of AMD) in 2011, and the HLS tool developed by AutoESL became the base of Xilinx HLS solutions, Vivado HLS and Vitis HLS, widely used for FPGA designs.

== Source input ==
The most common source inputs for high-level synthesis are based on standard languages such as ANSI C/C++, SystemC and MATLAB.

High-level synthesis typically also includes a bit-accurate executable specification as input, since to derive an efficient hardware implementation, additional information is needed on what is an acceptable Mean-Square Error or Bit-Error Rate etc. For example, if the designer starts with an FIR filter written using the "double" floating type, before they can derive an efficient hardware implementation, they need to perform numerical refinement to arrive at a fixed-point implementation. The refinement requires additional information on the level of quantization noise that can be tolerated, the valid input ranges etc. This bit-accurate specification makes the high level synthesis source specification functionally complete. Normally the tools infer from the high level code a Finite State Machine and a Datapath that implement arithmetic operations.

== Process stages ==
The high-level synthesis process consists of a number of activities. Various high-level synthesis tools perform these activities in different orders using different algorithms. Some high-level synthesis tools combine some of these activities or perform them iteratively to converge on the desired solution.

- Lexical processing
- Algorithm optimization
- Control/Dataflow analysis
- Library processing
- Resource allocation
- Scheduling
- Functional unit binding
- Register binding
- Output processing
- Input Rebundling

== Functionality ==
In general, an algorithm can be performed over many clock cycles with few hardware resources, or over fewer clock cycles using a larger number of ALUs, registers and memories. Correspondingly, from one algorithmic description, a variety of hardware microarchitectures can be generated by an HLS compiler according to the directives given to the tool. This is the same trade off of execution speed for hardware complexity as seen when a given program is run on conventional processors of differing performance, yet all running at roughly the same clock frequency.

=== Architectural constraints ===
Synthesis constraints for the architecture can automatically be applied based on the design analysis. These constraints can be broken into

- Hierarchy
- Interface
- Memory
- Loop
- Low-level timing constraints
- Iteration

=== Interface synthesis ===
Interface Synthesis refers to the ability to accept a pure C/C++ description as its input, then use automated interface synthesis technology to control the timing and communications protocol on the design interface. This enables interface analysis and exploration of a full range of hardware interface options such as streaming, single- or dual-port RAM plus various handshaking mechanisms. With interface synthesis, the designer does not embed interface protocols in the source description. Examples might be: direct connection, one line, 2-line handshake, FIFO.

== Vendors ==
Data reported on recent Survey

Status	Compiler	Owner	License	Input	Output	Year	Domain	Test bench	FP	FixP
In use	Stratus HLS	Cadence Design Systems	Commercial	C–C++ SystemC	RTL	2015	All	Yes	Yes	Yes
In use	AUGH	TIMA Lab.	Academic	C subset	VHDL	2012	All	Yes	No	No
In use	eXCite	Y Explorations	Commercial	C	VHDL–Verilog	2001	All	Yes	No	Yes
In use	Bambu	PoliMi	Academic	C	VHDL–Verilog	2012	All	Yes	Yes	No
In use	Bluespec	BlueSpec, Inc.	BSD-3	Bluespec SystemVerilog (Haskell)	SystemVerilog	2007	All	No	No	No
In use	QCC	CacheQ Systems, Inc.	Commercial	C, C++, Fortran	Host executable + FPGA bit file (SystemVerilog is intermediate)	2018	All - multi-core and heterogeneous compute	Yes (C++)	Yes	Yes
In use	CHC	Altium	Commercial	C subset	VHDL–Verilog	2008	All	No	Yes	Yes
In use	CoDeveloper	Impulse Accelerated	Commercial	Impulse-C	VHDL	2003	Image streaming	Yes	Yes	No
In use	HDL Coder	MathWorks	Commercial	MATLAB, Simulink, Stateflow, Simscape	VHDL, Verilog	2003	Control systems, signal processing, wireless, radar, communications, image and computer vision	Yes	Yes	Yes
In use	CyberWorkBench	NEC	Commercial	C, BDL, SystemC	VHDL–Verilog	2004	All	Cycle, formal	Yes	Yes
In use	Catapult	Siemens EDA	Commercial	C–C++ SystemC	VHDL–Verilog	2004	All	Yes	Yes	Yes
In use	DWARV	TU. Delft	Academic	C subset	VHDL	2012	All	Yes	Yes	Yes
In use	GAUT	University of Western Brittany	Academic	C, C++	VHDL	2010	DSP	Yes	No	Yes
In use	Hastlayer	Lombiq Technologies	BSD-3	C#, C++, F#, ... (.NET)	VHDL	2015	.NET	Yes	Yes	Yes
In use	Instant SoC	FPGA Cores	Commercial	C, C++	VHDL–Verilog	2019	All	Yes	No	No
In use	Intel High Level Synthesis Compiler	Intel FPGA (Formerly Altera)	Commercial	C, C++	Verilog	2017	All	Yes	Yes	Yes
In use	LegUp HLS	LegUp Computing	Commercial	C, C++	Verilog	2015	All	Yes	Yes	Yes
In use	LegUp	University of Toronto	Academic	C	Verilog	2010	All	Yes	Yes	No
In use	MaxCompiler	Maxeler	Commercial	MaxJ	RTL	2010	Data-flow analysis	No	Yes	No
In use	ROCCC	Jacquard Comp.	Commercial	C subset	VHDL	2010	Streaming	No	Yes	No
In use	Symphony C	Synopsys	Commercial	C, C++	VHDL–Verilog, SystemC	2010	All	Yes	No	Yes
In use	VivadoHLS (formerly AutoPilot from AutoESL)	Xilinx	Commercial	C–C++ SystemC	VHDL–Verilog, SystemC	2013	All	Yes	Yes	Yes
In use	Kiwi	University of Cambridge	Academic	C#	Verilog	2008	.NET	No	Yes	Yes
In use	CHiMPS	University of Washington	Academic	C	VHDL	2008	All	No	No	No
In use	gcc2verilog	Korea University	Academic	C	Verilog	2011	All	No	No	No
In use	HercuLeS	Ajax Compilers	Commercial	C/NAC	VHDL	2012	All	Yes	Yes	Yes
In use	Shang	University of Illinois Urbana-Champaign	Academic	C	Verilog	2013	All	Yes	?	?
In use	Trident	Los Alamos NL	Academic	C subset	VHDL	2007	Scientific	No	Yes	No
Aban- doned	AccelDSP	Xilinx	Commercial	MATLAB	VHDL–Verilog	2006	DSP	Yes	Yes	Yes
Aban- doned	C2H	Altera	Commercial	C	VHDL–Verilog	2006	All	No	No	No
Aban- doned	CtoVerilog	University of Haifa	Academic	C	Verilog	2008	All	No	No	No
Aban- doned	DEFACTO	University South Cailf.	Academic	C	RTL	1999	DSE	No	No	No
Aban- doned	Garp	University of California, Berkeley	Academic	C subset	bitstream	2000	Loop	No	No	No
Aban- doned	MATCH	Northwest University	Academic	MATLAB	VHDL	2000	Image	No	No	No
Aban- doned	Napa-C	Sarnoff Corp.	Academic	C subset	VHDL–Verilog	1998	Loop	No	No	No
Aban- doned	PipeRench	Carnegie Mellon University	Academic	DIL	bistream	2000	Stream	No	No	No
Aban- doned	SA-C	University of Colorado	Academic	SA-C	VHDL	2003	Image	No	No	No
Aban- doned	SeaCucumber	Brigham Young University	Academic	Java	EDIF	2002	All	No	Yes	Yes
Aban- doned	SPARK	University of California, Irvine	Academic	C	VHDL	2003	Control	No	No	No

- Dynamatic from EPFL/ETH Zurich
- MATLAB HDL Coder from Mathworks
- HLS-QSP from CircuitSutra Technologies
- C-to-Silicon from Cadence Design Systems
- Concurrent Acceleration from Concurrent EDA
- Symphony C Compiler from Synopsys
- QuickPlay from PLDA
- PowerOpt from ChipVision
- Cynthesizer from Forte Design Systems (now Stratus HLS from Cadence Design Systems)
- Catapult C from Calypto Design Systems, part of Mentor Graphics as of 2015, September 16. In November 2016 Siemens announced plans to acquire Mentor Graphics, Mentor Graphics became styled as "Mentor, a Siemens Business". In January 2021, the legal merger of Mentor Graphics with Siemens was completed - merging into the Siemens Industry Software Inc legal entity. Mentor Graphics' name was changed to Siemens EDA, a division of Siemens Digital Industries Software.
- PipelineC
- CyberWorkBench from NEC
- Mega Hardware
- C2R from CebaTech
- CoDeveloper from Impulse Accelerated Technologies
- HercuLeS by Nikolaos Kavvadias
- Program In/Code Out (PICO) from Synfora, acquired by Synopsys in June 2010
- xPilot from University of California, Los Angeles
- Vsyn from vsyn.ru
- ngDesign from SynFlow

== See also ==
- C to HDL
- Electronic design automation (EDA)
- Electronic system-level (ESL)
- Logic synthesis
- High-level verification (HLV)
- SystemVerilog
- Hardware acceleration
- Hardware/software co-design
