= Platform-based design =

Computer engineering methodology

Platform-based design is a design approach emphasizing systematic reuse, for developing complex products based upon platforms and compatible hardware and software virtual component, intended to reduce development risks, costs and time to market.

A platform is a library of components that can be assembled to generate a design at that level of abstraction. The platform-based design starts at the highest level of abstraction and carries out the design as a sequence of refinement steps at various levels of abstraction.

== See also ==
- Electronic design automation
- Electronic system-level design and verification
- Functional design
