= Control logic =

Control logic is a key part of a software program that controls the operations of the program. The control logic responds to commands from the user, and it also acts on its own to perform automated tasks that have been structured into the program.

Control logic can be modeled using a state diagram, which is a form of hierarchical state machine. These state diagrams can also be combined with flow charts to provide a set of computational semantics for describing complex control logic. This mix of state diagrams and flow charts is illustrated in the figure on the right, which shows the control logic for a simple stopwatch. The control logic takes in commands from the user, as represented by the event named "START", but also has automatic recurring sample time events, as represented by the event named "TIC".
