= Euler diagram =

Graphical set representation involving overlapping shapes

Euler diagram illustrating that the set of "animals with four legs" is a subset of "animals", but the set of "minerals" is a disjoint set (it has no members in common) with "animals"

Euler diagram showing the relationships between different Solar System objects

An Euler diagram (/ˈɔɪlər/, OY-lər) is a diagrammatic means of representing sets and their relationships. They are particularly useful for explaining complex hierarchies and overlapping definitions. They are similar to another set diagramming technique, Venn diagrams. Unlike Venn diagrams, which show all possible relations between different sets, the Euler diagram shows only relevant relationships.

The Swiss mathematician Leonhard Euler (1707–1783) is one of the most important authors in the history of this type of diagram, but he is only the namesake, not the inventor. Euler diagrams were first developed for logic, especially syllogistics, and only later transferred to set theory. In the United States, both Venn and Euler diagrams were incorporated as part of instruction in set theory as part of the new math movement of the 1960s. Since then, they have also been adopted by other curriculum fields such as reading as well as organizations and businesses.

Euler diagrams consist of simple closed shapes in a two-dimensional plane that each depict a set or category. How or whether these shapes overlap demonstrates the relationships between the sets. Each curve divides the plane into two regions or "zones": the interior, which symbolically represents the elements of the set, and the exterior, which represents all elements that are not members of the set. Curves which do not overlap represent disjoint sets, which have no elements in common. Two curves that overlap represent sets that intersect, that have common elements; the zone inside both curves represents the set of elements common to both sets (the intersection of the sets). A curve completely within the interior of another is a subset of it.

== History ==
Diagrams reminiscent of Euler diagrams and with similar functions seem to have existed for a long time. However, exact dates for these diagrams can only be determined historically after the invention of the printing press.

=== Before Euler ===
The first authors to print an Euler-esque diagram and briefly discuss it in their texts were Juan Luis Vives (in 1531), Nicolaus Reimers (in 1589), Bartholomäus Keckermann (in 1601) and Johann Heinrich Alsted (in 1614). The first detailed elaboration of these diagrams can be traced back to Erhard Weigel (1625–1699), who called this type of diagram a 'logometrum' (a measuring instrument for logic). Weigel was the first to prove all valid syllogisms with the aid of shapes in a two-dimensional plane. In the case of generally affirmative judgements (all-sentences), the geometric shape for the subject should lie completely within the shape for the predicate. In the case of negative judgements (no-sentences), it should lie completely outside. In the case of particular judgements (sentences with 'some', 'some...not'), the geometric shapes should partially overlap and not overlap. To prove a syllogism, one must first draw all possible figures for the premises and then see whether one can also read the conclusion from them. If this is the case, the syllogism is valid; otherwise, it is invalid.

Erhard Weigel used initial letters to represent the diagrams, whereas his students, such as Johann Christoph Sturm (1635–1703) and Gottfried Wilhelm Leibniz (1646–1716), used circles or lines. Another tradition can be traced back to Christian Weise (1642–1708), who is said to have used these diagrams in his teaching. This is reported by his students Samuel Großer and Johann Christian Lange. Lange in particular went beyond syllogistics with these diagrams and worked with quantified predicates, for example.

=== Euler and the time after ===
In his Letters to a German Princess, Euler focused solely on traditional syllogistics. He further developed Weigel's approach and not only tested the validity of syllogisms, but also developed a method for drawing conclusions from premises. At the same time as Euler, Gottfried Ploucquet and Johann Heinrich Lambert also used similar diagrams. However, the diagrams only became widely known in the 1790s through Immanuel Kant (1724–1804), who used them in his lectures on logic and his students then spread knowledge of the diagrams throughout Europe. In the 19th century, Euler diagrams became the most widely used form of representation in logic, esp. by 'Kantians' such as Arthur Schopenhauer, Karl Christian Friedrich Krause or Sir William Hamilton.

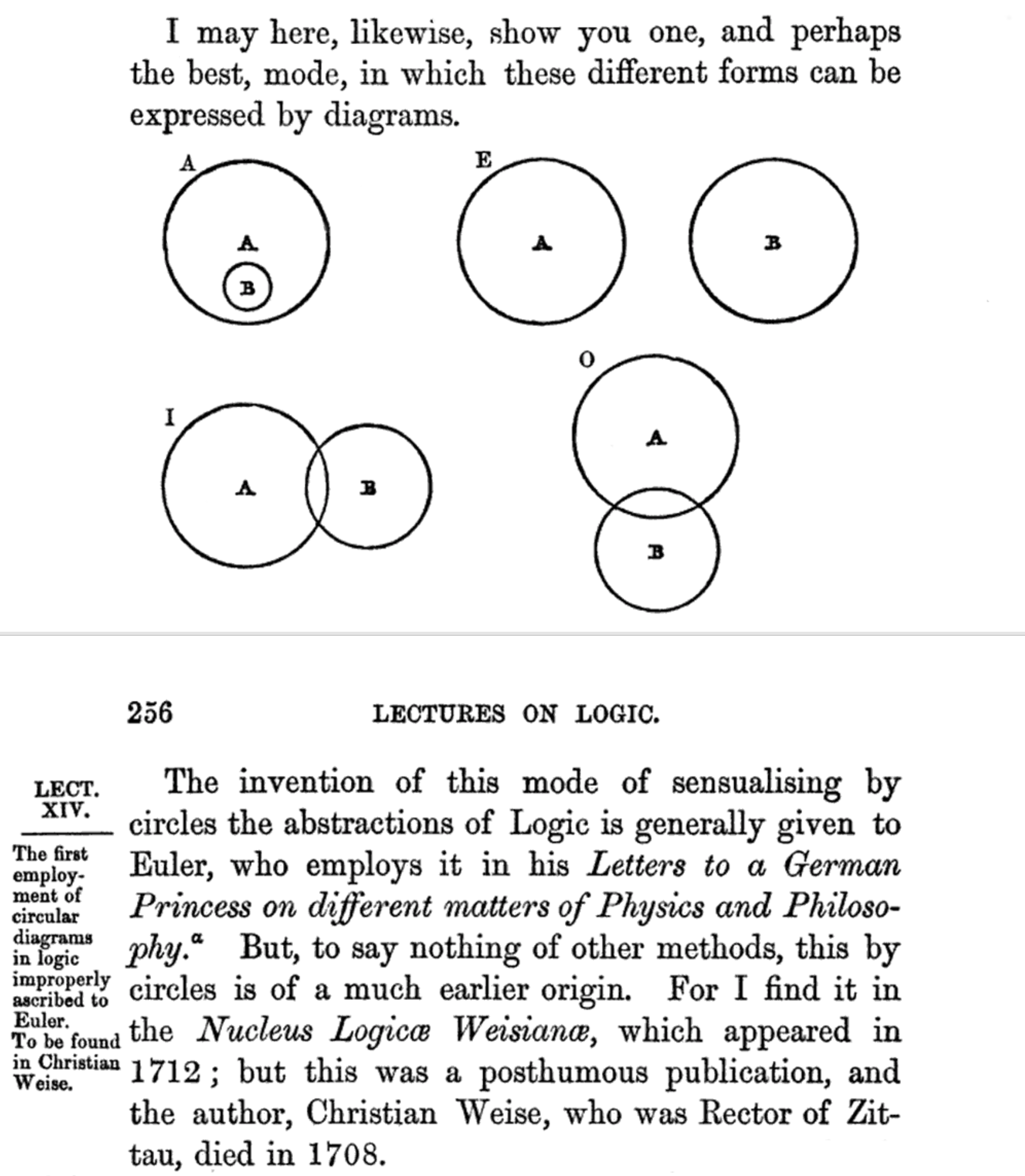
A page from Hamilton's Lectures on Logic; the symbols A, E, I, and O refer to four types of categorical statement which can occur in a syllogism (see descriptions, left) The small text to the left erroneously says: "The first employment of circular diagrams in logic improperly ascribed to Euler. To be found in Christian Weise", a book which was actually written by Johann Christian Lange.

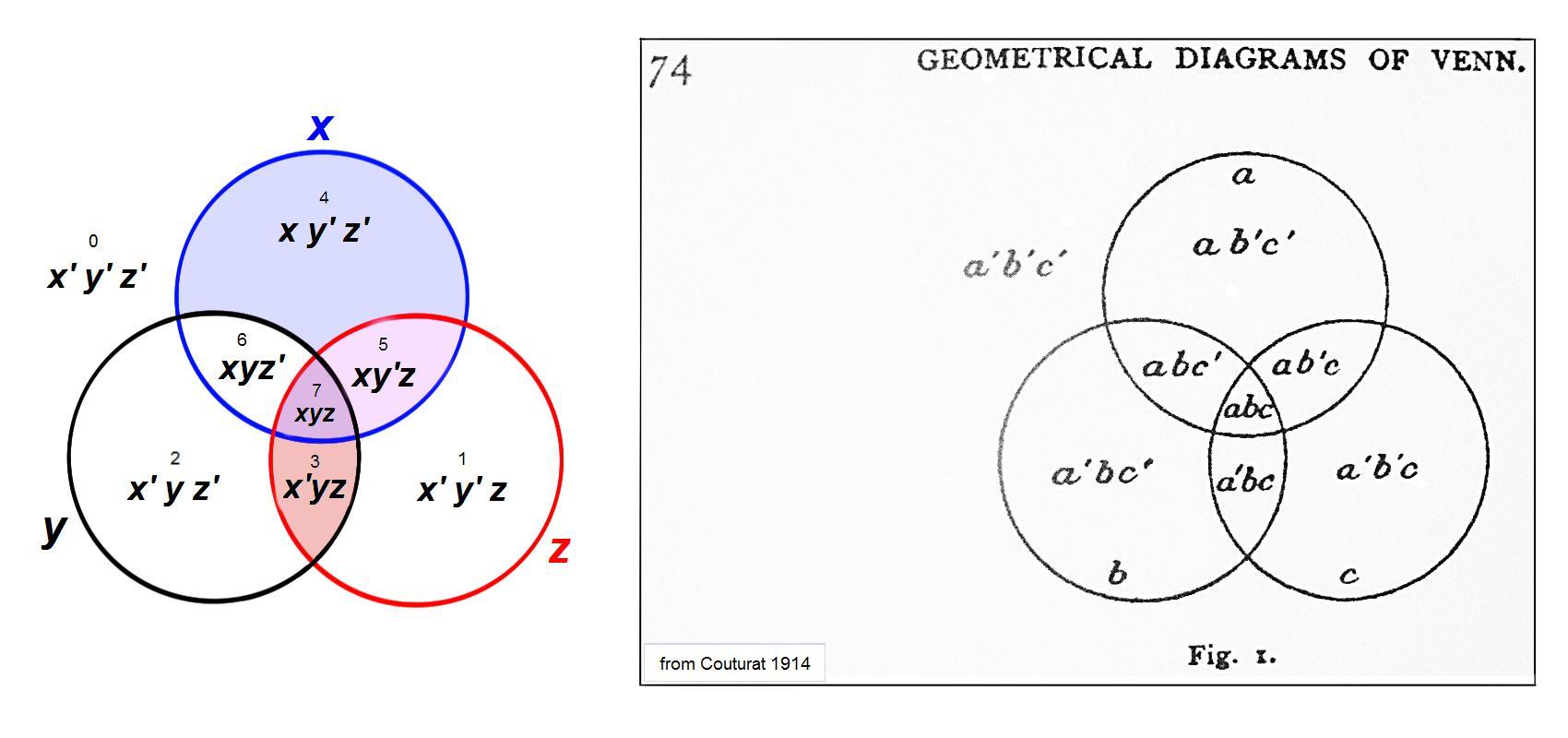
The diagram to the right is from Couturat in which he labels the 8 regions of the Venn diagram. The modern name for the "regions" is minterms. They are shown in the diagram with the variables x, y, and z per Venn's drawing. The symbolism is as follows: logical AND [ & ] is represented by arithmetic multiplication, and the logical NOT [ ¬ ] is represented by ⟨′⟩ after the variable, e.g. the region x′y′z is read as "(NOT x) AND (NOT y) AND z" i.e. (¬ x) & (¬ y) & z .

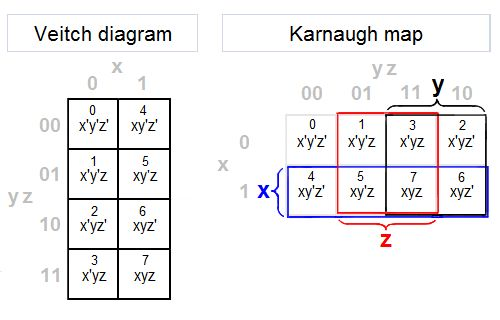
Both the Veitch diagram and Karnaugh map show all the minterms, but the Veitch is not particularly useful for reduction of formulas. Observe the strong resemblance between the Venn and Karnaugh diagrams; the colors and the variables x, y, and z are per Venn's example.

Since the history of the diagrams was only partially researched in the 19th century, most logicians attributed the diagrams to Euler, leading to numerous misunderstandings, some of which persist to this day. As shown in the illustration to the right, Sir William Hamilton erroneously asserted that the original use of the circles to "sensualize... the abstractions of logic" was not Euler but rather Weise; however the latter book was actually written by Johann Christian Lange, rather than Weise. He references Euler's Letters to a German Princess. (Note: By the time these lectures of Hamilton were published, Hamilton had died. His editors (marked by ED.), responsible for most of the footnote text, were the logicians Henry Longueville Mansel and John Veitch.)

In Hamilton's illustration of the four categorical propositions which can occur in a syllogism as symbolized by the drawings A, E, I, and O are:

A: The Universal Affirmative

Example: All metals are elements.

E: The Universal Negative

Example: No metals are compound substances.

I: The Particular Affirmative

Example: Some metals are brittle.

O: The Particular Negative

Example: Some metals are not brittle.

=== Euler diagrams in the era of Venn ===
John Venn (1834–1923) comments on the remarkable prevalence of the Euler diagram:

"... of the first sixty logical treatises, published during the last century or so, which were consulted for this purpose–somewhat at random, as they happened to be most accessible–it appeared that thirty four appealed to the aid of diagrams, nearly all of these making use of the Eulerian scheme."

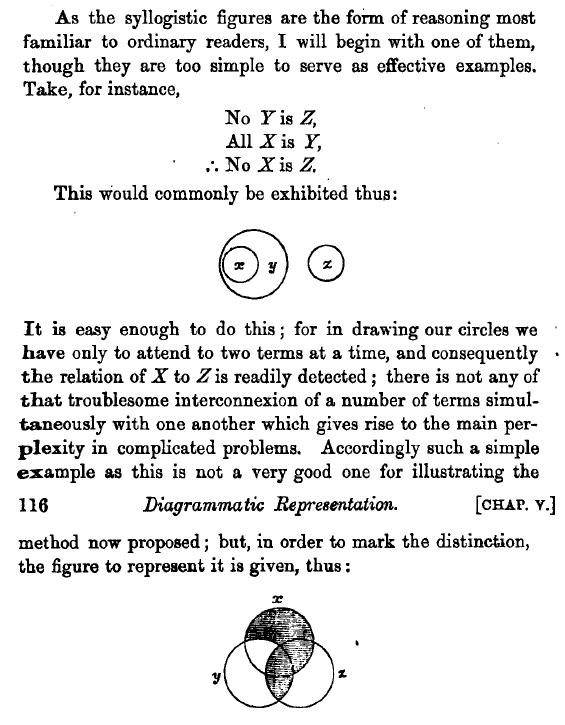
Composite of two pages from Venn (1881a), pp. 115–116 showing his example of how to convert a syllogism of three parts into his type of diagram; Venn calls the circles "Eulerian circles" (Note: cf Sandifer (2004) Venn (1881a), pp. 114 ff; in the "Eulerian scheme" Venn (1881a), p. 100 of "old-fashioned Eulerian diagrams" Venn (1881a), p. 113)

But nevertheless, he contended, "the inapplicability of this scheme for the purposes of a really general logic" and then noted that,

“It fits in, but badly, even with the four propositions of the common logic to which it is normally applied.”

Venn ends his chapter with the observation illustrated in the examples below—that their use is based on practice and intuition, not on a strict algorithmic practice:

“In fact ... those diagrams not only do not fit in with the ordinary scheme of propositions which they are employed to illustrate, but do not seem to have any recognized scheme of propositions to which they could be consistently affiliated.”

Finally, in his Venn gets to a crucial criticism (italicized in the quote below); observe in Hamilton's illustration that the O (Particular Negative) and I (Particular Affirmative) are simply rotated:

“We now come to Euler's well-known circles which were first described in his Lettres a une Princesse d'Allemagne (Letters 102–105). The weak point about these consists in the fact that they only illustrate in strictness the actual relations of classes to one another, rather than the imperfect knowledge of these relations which we may possess, or wish to convey, by means of the proposition. Accordingly they will not fit in with the propositions of common logic, but demand the constitution of a new group of appropriate elementary propositions. ... This defect must have been noticed from the first in the case of the particular affirmative and negative, for the same diagram is commonly employed to stand for them both, which it does indifferently well”.[italics added] (Note: Sandifer (2004) points out that Euler himself also makes such observations: Euler reports that his figure 45 (a simple intersection of two circles) has 4 different interpretations.)

Whatever the case, armed with these observations and criticisms, Venn then demonstrates how he derived what has become known as his Venn diagrams from the “... old-fashioned Euler diagrams.” In particular Venn gives an example, shown at the left.

By 1914, Couturat (1868–1914) had labeled the terms as shown on the drawing at the right. Moreover, he had labeled the exterior region (shown as a′b′c′) as well. He succinctly explains how to use the diagram – one must strike out the regions that are to vanish:

"Venn's method is translated in geometrical diagrams which represent all the constituents, so that, in order to obtain the result, we need only strike out (by shading) those which are made to vanish by the data of the problem."[italics added]

Given the Venn's assignments, then, the unshaded areas inside the circles can be summed to yield the following equation for Venn's example:

"No y is z and ALL x is y: therefore No x is z" has the equation x′yz′ + xyz′ + x′y′z for the unshaded area inside the circles (but this is not entirely correct; see the next paragraph).

In Venn the background surrounding the circles, does not appear: That is, the term marked "0", x′y′z′ . Nowhere is it discussed or labeled, but Couturat corrects this in his drawing. The correct equation must include this unshaded area shown in boldface:

"No y is z and ALL x is y: therefore No x is z" has the equation x′yz′ + xyz′ + x′y′z + x′y′z′.

In modern use, the Venn diagram includes a "box" that surrounds all the circles; this is called the universe of discourse or the domain of discourse.

Couturat observed that, in a direct algorithmic (formal, systematic) manner, one cannot derive reduced Boolean equations, nor does it show how to arrive at the conclusion "No x is z". Couturat concluded that the process "has ... serious inconveniences as a method for solving logical problems":

"It does not show how the data are exhibited by canceling certain constituents, nor does it show how to combine the remaining constituents so as to obtain the consequences sought. In short, it serves only to exhibit one single step in the argument, namely the equation of the problem; it dispenses neither with the previous steps, i. e., "throwing of the problem into an equation" and the transformation of the premises, nor with the subsequent steps, i. e., the combinations that lead to the various consequences. Hence it is of very little use, inasmuch as the constituents can be represented by algebraic symbols quite as well as by plane regions, and are much easier to deal with in this form."

Thus the matter would rest until 1952 when Maurice Karnaugh (1924–2022) would adapt and expand a method proposed by Edward W. Veitch; this work would rely on the truth table method precisely defined by Emil Post and the application of propositional logic to switching logic by (among others) Shannon, Stibitz, and Turing. (Note: See footnote in George Stibitz article.) For example, Hill & Peterson (1968) present the Venn diagram with shading and all. They give examples of Venn diagrams to solve example switching-circuit problems, but end up with this statement:

"For more than three variables, the basic illustrative form of the Venn diagram is inadequate. Extensions are possible, however, the most convenient of which is the Karnaugh map, to be discussed in Chapter 6."

In Chapter 6, section 6.4 "Karnaugh map representation of Boolean functions" they begin with:

"The Karnaugh map^{1} [^{1}Karnaugh 1953] is one of the most powerful tools in the repertory of the logic designer. ... A Karnaugh map may be regarded either as a pictorial form of a truth table or as an extension of the Venn diagram."

The history of Karnaugh's development of his "chart" or "map" method is obscure. The chain of citations becomes an academic game of "credit, credit; ¿who's got the credit?": Karnaugh (1953) referenced Veitch (1952), Veitch, referenced Shannon (1938), and Shannon (1938), in turn referenced (among other authors of logic texts) Couturat (1914). In Veitch's method the variables are arranged in a rectangle or square; as described in Karnaugh map, Karnaugh in his method changed the order of the variables to correspond to what has become known as (the vertices of) a hypercube.

=== Modern use of Euler diagrams ===
In the 1990s, Euler diagrams were developed as a logical system. The cognitive advantages of the diagrams soon became apparent. The diagrams were therefore not only used as set diagrams, but have since been used in many different ways and functions in computer science including artificial intelligence and software engineering, information technology, bioscience, medicine, economics, statistics and many other fields, and their philosophy and history have been discussed. In 2000, the conference series The Theory and Application on Diagrams: An International Conference Series began, which regularly addresses current research on Euler diagrams, among other topics.

== Relation between Euler and Venn diagrams ==
Examples of small Venn diagrams (on left) showing how they can be easily transformed into equivalent Euler diagrams (right). In these, black shaded regions represent empty sets (to diagram universal quantification), red shaded regions with an x represent nonempty sets (to diagram existential quantification), and the other regions have not been specified as empty or non-empty.

Venn diagrams are a more restrictive form of Euler diagrams. A Venn diagram must contain all 2^{n} logically possible zones of overlap between its n curves, representing all combinations of inclusion/exclusion of its constituent sets. Regions not part of the set are indicated by coloring them black, in contrast to Euler diagrams, where membership in the set is indicated by overlap as well as color. When the number of sets grows beyond 3 a Venn diagram becomes visually complex, especially compared to the corresponding Euler diagram. The difference between Euler and Venn diagrams can be seen in the following example. Take the three sets:

- $A = \{1,\, 2,\, 5\}$
- $B = \{1,\, 6\}$
- $C = \{4,\, 7\}$

The Euler and the Venn diagrams of those sets are:

Euler diagram

Venn diagram

In a logical setting, one can use model-theoretic semantics to interpret Euler diagrams, within a universe of discourse. In the examples below, the Euler diagram depicts that the sets Animal and Mineral are disjoint since the corresponding curves are disjoint, and also that the set Four Legs is a subset of the set of Animals. The Venn diagram, which uses the same categories of Animal, Mineral, and Four Legs, does not encapsulate these relationships. Traditionally the emptiness of a set in Venn diagrams is depicted by shading in the region. Euler diagrams represent emptiness either by shading or by the absence of a region.

Often a set of well-formedness conditions are imposed; these are topological or geometric constraints imposed on the structure of the diagram. For example, connectedness of zones might be enforced, or concurrency of curves or multiple points might be banned, as might tangential intersection of curves. In the adjacent diagram, examples of small Venn diagrams are transformed into Euler diagrams by sequences of transformations; some of the intermediate diagrams have concurrency of curves. However, this sort of transformation of a Venn diagram with shading into an Euler diagram without shading is not always possible. There are examples of Euler diagrams with 9 sets that are not drawable using simple closed curves without the creation of unwanted zones since they would have to have non-planar dual graphs.

=== Example: Euler- to Venn-diagram and Karnaugh map ===
This example shows the Euler and Venn diagrams and Karnaugh map deriving and verifying the deduction "No Xs are Zs". In the illustration and table the following logical symbols are used:

- 1 can be read as "true", 0 as "false"
- ~ for NOT and abbreviated to ′ when illustrating the minterms e.g. x′ =_{defined} NOT x,
- + for Boolean OR (from Boolean algebra: 0 + 0 = 0, 0 + 1 = 1 + 0 = 1, 1 + 1 = 1)
- & (logical AND) between propositions; in the minterms AND is omitted in a manner similar to arithmetic multiplication: e.g. x′y′z =_{defined} ~x & ~y & z (From Boolean algebra: 0⋅0 = 0, 0⋅1 = 1⋅0 = 0, 1⋅1 = 1, where "⋅" is shown for clarity)
- → (logical IMPLICATION): read as IF ... THEN ..., or " IMPLIES ", P → Q = _{defined} NOT P OR Q

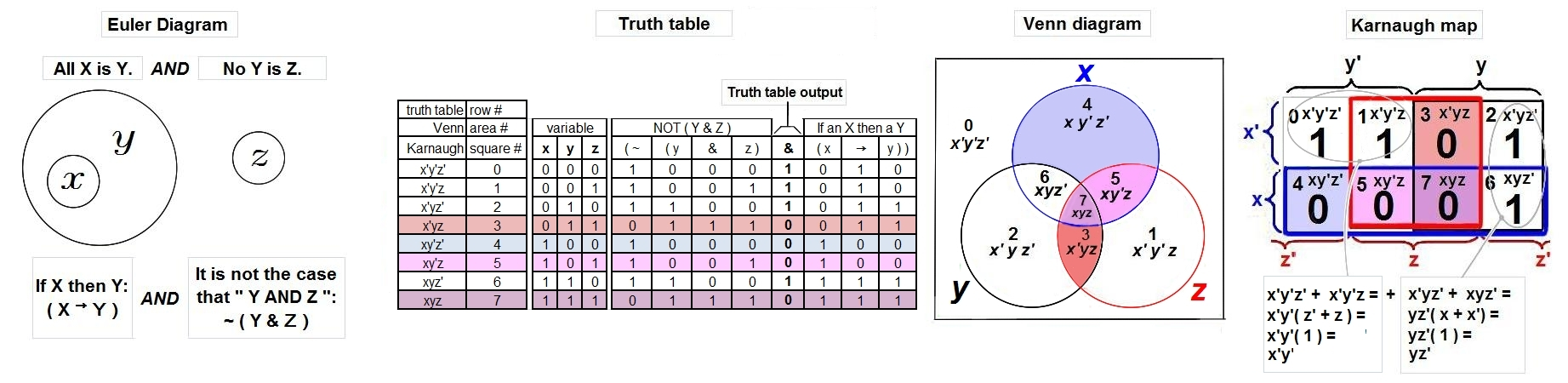
Before it can be presented in a Venn diagram or Karnaugh Map, the Euler diagram's syllogism "No Y is Z, All X is Y" must first be reworded into the more formal language of the propositional calculus: " 'It is not the case that: Y AND Z′ AND 'If an X then a Y′ ". Once the propositions are reduced to symbols and a propositional formula ( ~(y & z) & (x → y) ), one can construct the formula's truth table; from this table the Venn and/or the Karnaugh map are readily produced. By use of the adjacency of "1"s in the Karnaugh map (indicated by the grey ovals around terms 0 and 1 and around terms 2 and 6) one can "reduce" the example's Boolean equation i.e. (x′y′z′ + x′y′z) + (x′yz′ + xyz′) to just two terms: x′y′ + yz′. But the means for deducing the notion that "No X is Z", and just how the reduction relates to this deduction, is not forthcoming from this example.

Given a proposed conclusion such as "No X is a Z", one can test whether or not it is a correct deduction by use of a truth table. The easiest method is put the starting formula on the left (abbreviate it as P) and put the (possible) deduction on the right (abbreviate it as Q) and connect the two with logical implication i.e. P → Q, read as IF P THEN Q. If the evaluation of the truth table produces all 1s under the implication-sign (→, the so-called major connective) then P → Q is a tautology. Given this fact, one can "detach" the formula on the right (abbreviated as Q) in the manner described below the truth table.

Given the example above, the formula for the Euler and Venn diagrams is:

"No Ys are Zs" and "All Xs are Ys": ( ~(y & z) & (x → y) ) =_{defined} P

And the proposed deduction is:

"No Xs are Zs": ( ~ (x & z) ) =_{defined} Q

So now the formula to be evaluated can be abbreviated to:

( ~(y & z) & (x → y) ) → ( ~ (x & z) ): P → Q
IF ( "No Ys are Zs" and "All Xs are Ys" ) THEN ( "No Xs are Zs" )

The Truth Table demonstrates that the formula ( ~(y & z) & (x → y) ) → ( ~ (x & z) ) is a tautology as shown by all 1s in yellow column.
Square no.	Venn, Karnaugh region	x	y	z	(~	(y	&	z)	&	(x	→	y))	→	(~	(x	&	z))
0	x′y′z′	0	0	0	1	0	0	0	1	0	1	0	1	1	0	0	0
1	x′y′z	0	0	1	1	0	0	1	1	0	1	0	1	1	0	0	1
2	x′yz′	0	1	0	1	1	0	0	1	0	1	1	1	1	0	0	0
3	x′yz	0	1	1	0	1	1	1	0	0	1	1	1	1	0	0	1
4	xy′z′	1	0	0	1	0	0	0	0	1	0	0	1	1	1	0	0
5	xy′z	1	0	1	1	0	0	1	0	1	0	0	1	0	1	1	1
6	xyz′	1	1	0	1	1	0	0	1	1	1	1	1	1	1	0	0
7	xyz	1	1	1	0	1	1	1	0	1	1	1	1	0	1	1	1

At this point the above implication P → Q (i.e. ~(y & z) & (x → y) ) → ~(x & z) ) is still a formula, and the deduction – the "detachment" of Q out of P → Q – has not occurred. But given the demonstration that P → Q is tautology, the stage is now set for the use of the procedure of modus ponens to "detach" Q: "No Xs are Zs" and dispense with the terms on the left. (Note: This is a sophisticated concept. Russell and Whitehead (2nd edition 1927) in their Principia Mathematica describe it this way: "The trust in inference is the belief that if the two former assertions [the premises P, P→Q ] are not in error, the final assertion is not in error . . . An inference is the dropping of a true premiss [sic]; it is the dissolution of an implication" (p. 9). Further discussion of this appears in "Primitive Ideas and Propositions" as the first of their "primitive propositions" (axioms): *1.1 Anything implied by a true elementary proposition is true" (p. 94). In a footnote the authors refer the reader back to Russell's 1903 Principles of Mathematics §38.)

Modus ponens (or "the fundamental rule of inference") is often written as follows: The two terms on the left, P → Q and P, are called premises (by convention linked by a comma), the symbol ⊢ means "yields" (in the sense of logical deduction), and the term on the right is called the conclusion:

P → Q, P ⊢ Q

For the modus ponens to succeed, both premises P → Q and P must be true. Because, as demonstrated above the premise P → Q is a tautology, "truth" is always the case no matter how x, y and z are valued, but "truth" is only the case for P in those circumstances when P evaluates as "true" (e.g. rows 0 OR 1 OR 2 OR 6: x′y′z′ + x′y′z + x′yz′ + xyz′ = x′y′ + yz′). (Note: Reichenbach discusses the fact that the implication P → Q need not be a tautology (a so-called "tautological implication"). Even "simple" implication (connective or adjunctive) work, but only for those rows of the truth table that evaluate as true, cf Reichenbach 1947:64–66.)

P → Q, P ⊢ Q
- i.e.: ( ~(y & z) & (x → y) ) → ( ~ (x & z) ), ( ~(y & z) & (x → y) ) ⊢ ( ~ (x & z) )
- i.e.: IF "No Ys are Zs" and "All Xs are Ys" THEN "No Xs are Zs", "No Ys are Zs" and "All Xs are Ys" ⊢ "No Xs are Zs"

One is now free to "detach" the conclusion "No Xs are Zs", perhaps to use it in a subsequent deduction (or as a topic of conversation).

The use of tautological implication means that other possible deductions exist besides "No Xs are Zs"; the criterion for a successful deduction is that the 1s under the sub-major connective on the right include all the 1s under the sub-major connective on the left (the major connective being the implication that results in the tautology). For example, in the truth table, on the right side of the implication (→, the major connective symbol) the bold-face column under the sub-major connective symbol " ~ " has all the same 1s that appear in the bold-faced column under the left-side sub-major connective & (rows 0, 1, 2 and 6), plus two more (rows 3 and 4).

== Gallery ==
A clickable Euler diagram showing the relationships between various European regional organisations

A Venn diagram showing all possible intersections

Euler diagram visualizing a real situation, the relationships between various supranational European organizations (clickable version)

Humorous diagram comparing Euler and Venn diagrams

Euler diagram of types of triangles, using the definition that isosceles triangles have at least (rather than exactly) 2 equal sides

Euler diagram of terminology of the British Isles

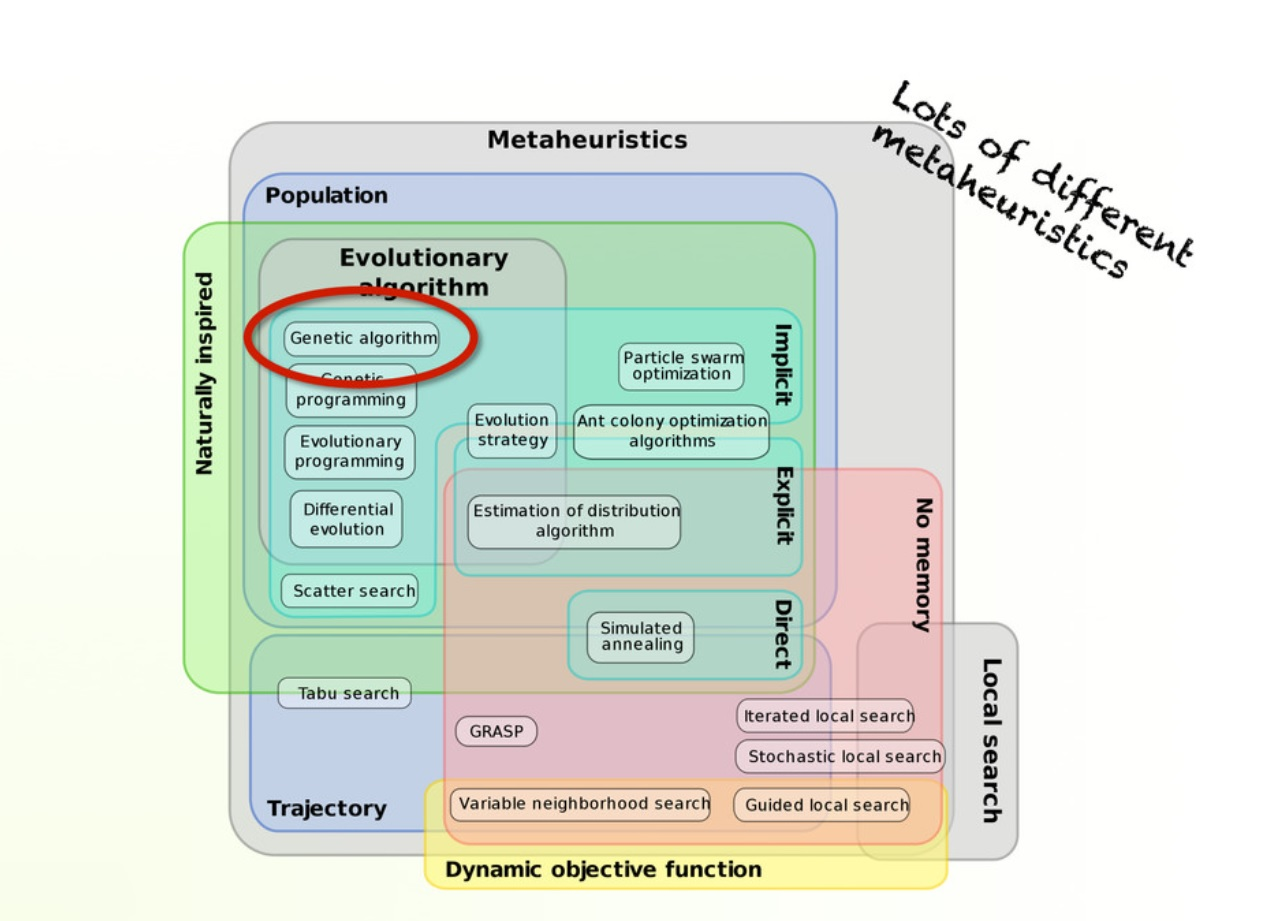
Euler diagram categorizing different types of metaheuristics

Euler Diagram displaying the relationship between homographs, homophones, and synonyms

The 22 (of 256) essentially different Venn diagrams with 3 circles (top) and their corresponding Euler diagrams.(bottom)
Some of the Euler diagrams are not typical; some are even equivalent to Venn diagrams. Areas are shaded to indicate that they contain no elements.

Henri Milne-Edwards's (1844) diagram of relationships of vertebrate animals, illustrated as a series of nested sets

Euler diagram of numbers under 100

== See also ==
- Intersectionality
- Rainbow box
- Spider diagram – an extension of Euler diagrams adding existence to contour intersections
- Three circles model

== Sources ==
- Couturat, Louis (1914). The Algebra of Logic: Authorized English Translation by Lydia Gillingham Robinson with a Preface by Philip E. B. Jourdain. Chicago and London: The Open Court Publishing Company.
- Sir William Hamilton (1860). Mansel, Henry Longueville; Veitch, John (eds.). Lectures on Metaphysics and Logic. Edinburgh and London: William Blackwood and Sons.
- Jevons, W. Stanley (1880). Elementary Lessons in Logic: Deductive and Inductive. With Copious Questions and Examples, and a Vocabulary of Logical Terms. London and New York: M. A. MacMillan and Co.
- Karnaugh, Maurice (November 1953) [1953-04-23, 1953-03-17]. "The Map Method for Synthesis of Combinational Logic Circuits" (PDF). Transactions of the American Institute of Electrical Engineers, Part I: Communication and Electronics. 72 (5): 593–599. Bibcode:1953TAICE..72..593K. doi:10.1109/TCE.1953.6371932. S2CID 51636736. Paper 53-217. Archived from the original (PDF) on 2017-04-16.
- Sandifer, Ed (January 2004). "How Euler Did It" (PDF). maa.org. Archived from the original (PDF) on 2013-01-26.
- Veitch, Edward Westbrook (1952-05-03) [1952-05-02]. "A chart method for simplifying truth functions". Proceedings of the 1952 ACM national meeting (Pittsburgh) on - ACM '52. New York, USA: Association for Computing Machinery. pp. 127–133. doi:10.1145/609784.609801. ISBN 978-1-4503-7362-3. S2CID 17284651.
