= Product term =

AND of literals forming a term in a Boolean expression

In Boolean logic, a product term is a conjunction of literals, where each literal is either a variable or its negation.

== Examples ==
Examples of product terms include:

$$A \wedge B$$
$$A \wedge (\neg B) \wedge (\neg C)$$
$$\neg A$$

== Origin ==
The terminology comes from the similarity of AND to multiplication as in the ring structure of Boolean rings.

== Minterms ==
For a boolean function of $n$ variables ${x_1,\dots,x_n}$, a product term in which each of the $n$ variables appears once (in either its complemented or uncomplemented form) is called a minterm. Thus, a minterm is a logical expression of n variables that employs only the complement operator and the conjunction operator.
