= Maurice Karnaugh =

American computer scientist (1924–2022)

- Born: October 4, 1924; New York City, U.S.
- Died: November 8, 2022 (aged 98); New York City, U.S.
- Known for: Karnaugh map
- Spouse: Linn Blank (m. 1970)

Maurice Karnaugh (/ˈkɑːrnɔː/; October 4, 1924 – November 8, 2022) was an American physicist, mathematician, computer scientist, and inventor known for the Karnaugh map used in Boolean algebra.

== Early life and education ==
Karnaugh earned a B.A in physics from the City College of New York in 1948 and a PhD. in physics from Yale in 1952.

He later studied mathematics and physics at City College of New York (1944 to 1948) and transferred to Yale University to complete his B.Sc. (1949), M.Sc. (1950) and Ph.D. in physics with a thesis on The Theory of Magnetic Resonance and Lambda-Type Doubling in Nitric-Oxide (1952).

== Career ==
Karnaugh worked at Bell Labs and IBM from 1952 to 1993.

From 1980 until 1999 Karnaugh taught computer science at Polytechnic University of New York.

At Bell Labs, (1952 to 1966), developing the PLC (aura) map (1954) as well as patents for PCM encoding and magnetic logic circuits and coding. He later worked at IBM's Federal Systems Division in Gaithersburg (1966 to 1970) and at the IBM Thomas J. Watson Research Center (1970 to 1994), studying multistage interconnection networks.

Karnaugh was elected an IEEE Fellow in 1976, and held an adjunct position at Polytechnic University of New York (now New York University Tandon School of Engineering) at the Westchester campus from 1980 to 1999.

== Karnaugh Map ==
While at Bell Labs, in 1953 Karnaugh invented a form of logic diagram which provides an alternative technique for representing Boolean functions. The diagram is known as the Karnaugh Map.

== Personal life and death ==
Karnaugh was married to the former Linn Blank Weil from 1970 until his death in 2022. He had two sons, Robert Victor Karnaugh and Paul Joseph Karnaugh, from his first marriage.

Karnaugh died in The Bronx on November 8, 2022, at the age of 98.

== Publications ==
- Karnaugh, Maurice (November 1953) [1953-04-23, 1953-03-17]. "The Map Method for Synthesis of Combinational Logic Circuits" (PDF). Transactions of the American Institute of Electrical Engineers, Part I: Communication and Electronics. 72 (5): 593–599. doi:10.1109/TCE.1953.6371932. S2CID 51636736. Paper 53-217. Archived from the original (PDF) on 2017-04-16.
- Karnaugh, Maurice (June 1972). "Issues in Computer Communications". IEEE Transactions on Communications. 20 (3): 495–498. doi:10.1109/TCOM.1972.1091197. S2CID 51640082.
- Karnaugh, Maurice (May 1976). "A New Class of Algorithms for Multipoint Network Optimization". IEEE Transactions on Communications. 24 (5): 500–505. doi:10.1109/TCOM.1976.1093334.
- Karnaugh, Maurice (March 1992). Generalized quicksearch for expert systems. Eighth Conference on Artificial Intelligence for Applications. pp. 30–34. doi:10.1109/CAIA.1992.200007.
- Karnaugh, Maurice (2017-01-17) [2015-07-05]. "Symbolic Sets and the Real Line" (PDF). symbolicsets.com. Archived (PDF) from the original on 2018-08-15. (61 pages)

== See also ==
- List of pioneers in computer science
