= A Mind at Play =

2017 book by Jimmy Soni and Rob Goodman

A Mind at Play: How Claude Shannon Invented the Information Age
- First edition
- Author: Jimmy Soni, Rob Goodman
- Language: English
- Subject: Claude Shannon
- Genre: Biography
- Publisher: Simon & Schuster
- Publication date: July 18, 2017
- Publication place: United States
- Media type: Print (hardcover), e-book, audiobook
- Pages: 384
- ISBN: 978-1476766683
- Preceded by: Rome's Last Citizen

A Mind at Play: How Claude Shannon Invented the Information Age is a biography of Claude Shannon, an American mathematician, electrical engineer, and cryptographer known as "the father of information theory". The biography was written by Jimmy Soni and Rob Goodman, and published by Simon & Schuster in 2017. A Mind at Play is the second biography co-authored by Soni and Goodman, the first being a biography of Cato entitled Rome's Last Citizen.

== Background ==
In an interview with the Institute of Electrical and Electronics Engineers, Soni explained that part of the reason he wrote A Mind at Play was that he was drawn to Shannon's personality and wanted to read a biography about him, but "it turned out there wasn’t one."

== Synopsis ==
Shannon was born in Petoskey, Michigan in 1916 and grew up in Gaylord, Michigan. He is well known for founding digital circuit design theory in 1937, when—as a 21-year-old master's degree student at MIT—he wrote his thesis demonstrating that electrical applications of Boolean algebra could construct any logical numerical relationship. In 1948, Shannon published his most influential work, A Mathematical Theory of Communication, in which he is considered to have founded the field of information theory and paved the way for the feasibility of mobile phones, the development of the Internet and many other technological applications. A Mind at Play chronicles these events in Shannon's life as well as his interactions with his peers at the time including Albert Einstein, Alan Turing, Vannevar Bush, John von Neumann, Kurt Gödel, Leonard Kleinrock, Irwin M. Jacobs, Lawrence Roberts, Thomas Kailath, Steve Jobs and others.

Outside of Shannon's professional life, he was interested in juggling, unicycling, and chess. He also invented many devices, including a Roman numeral computer called THROBAC, juggling machines, and a flame-throwing trumpet. He is also considered the co-inventor of the first wearable computer along with Edward O. Thorp. The device was used to improve the odds when playing roulette.

== Reception ==
A Mind at Play was reviewed favorably by The Wall Street Journal, Financial Times, Nature, Fortune Magazine and others. Excerpts from the biography have been the feature of various magazines including The Daily Beast and Nautilus. Ruby on Rails founder David Heinemeier Hansson and Amazon chief technology officer Werner Vogels wrote about the book on Twitter.

Internet pioneer Vint Cerf called the book, "a boon for those eager to know more about [Shannon's] incredibly influential life — whimsical, independent and curiosity-driven."

The British Society for the History of Mathematics awarded Soni and Goodman the 2017 Neumann Prize for A Mind at Play. The book also won the silver medal in the Biography category of the Axiom Business Book Awards.

== See also ==
- Bell Labs
- The Idea Factory
