= Mazin =

Mazin may refer to:

- Mazin (given name), an Arabic masculine name
- Mazin (surname), a surname found in Russia and France
  - Jean-Michel Mazin (born 1950), French paleontologist
- Mazin, Croatia, a village near Gračac
- MazinSaga, a Japanese manga
  - Mazin Saga: Mutant Fighter, a video game

== See also ==
- Mazina (disambiguation)
- Amazin
