= Mazina =

Mazina may refer to:

- Mazina, another form of Mazin (surname), a Russian surname
- Lecithocera mazina, a moth

== See also ==
- Mazin (disambiguation)
