= Mazin (given name) =

Mazin is an masculine given name of Arabic origin, meaning "rain clouds". Notable people with the name include:

== Given name ==
- Mazin Elsadig (born 1987), American actor
- Mazin Abdellah Hilal Al Farrayeh (born 1969), Jordanian politician
- Mazin Fayyadh (born 1997), Iraqi footballer
- Mazin Gilbert, American engineer
- Mazin Hamid (born 1992), Sudanese musician
- Mazin Ahmed Al-Huthayfi (born 1985), Saudi footballer
- Mazin Abu Kalal (died 2013), Iraqi politician
- Mazin Al-Kasbi (born 1993), Omani footballer
- Mazin Mohamedein (born 2000), Sudanese footballer
- Māzin Mubārak (1930–2026), Syrian linguist, scholar, and academic
- Mazin Qumsiyeh (born 1957), Palestinian scientist
- Mazin Shooni (born 1961), Iraqi-American three-cushion billiards player
