= A Symbolic Analysis of Relay and Switching Circuits =

Master's thesis by C. E. Shannon

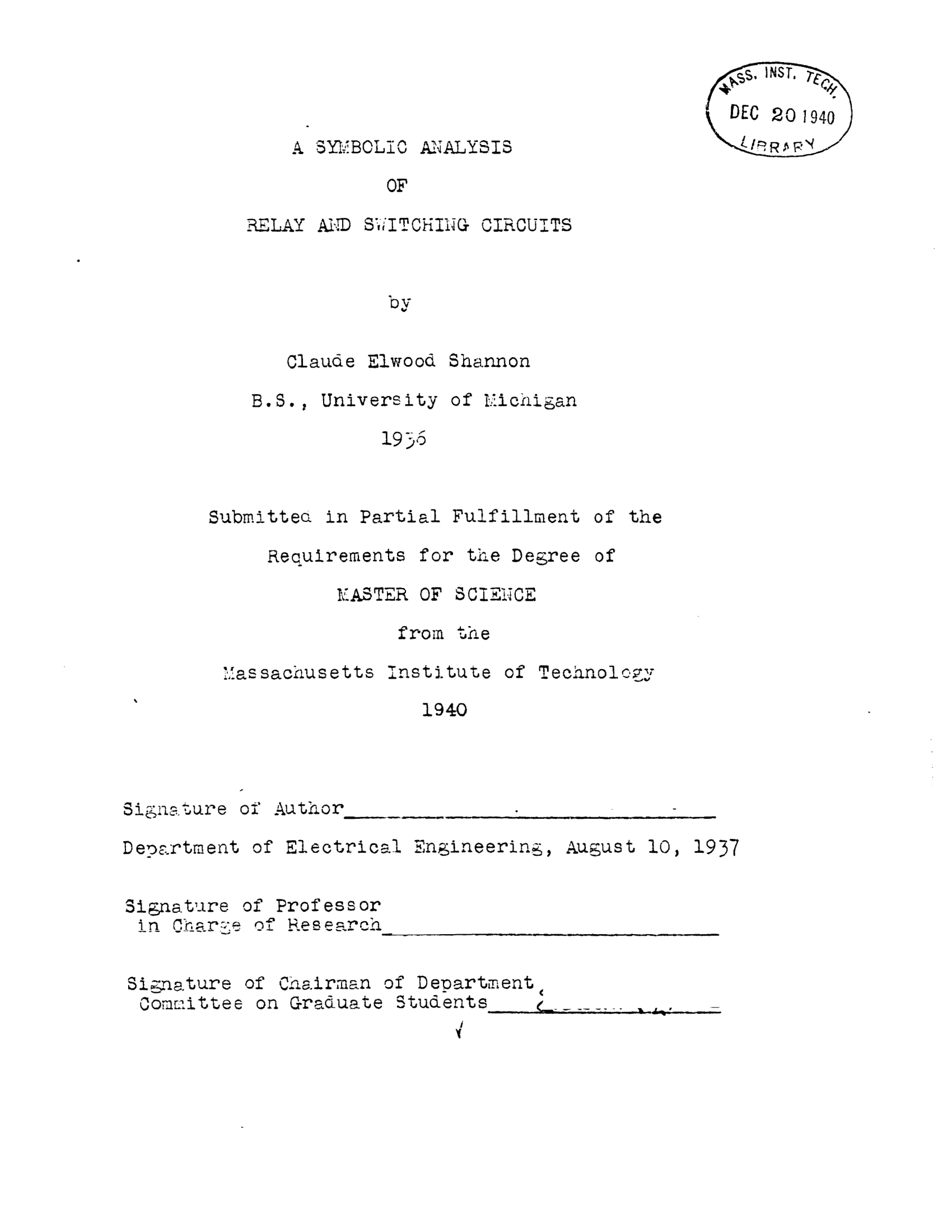
- Title page
- Author: Claude E. Shannon
- Language: English
- Subject: Switching circuit theory
- Genre: Computer Science
- Publisher: MIT Press
- Publication date: 1938
- Publication place: United States
- Text: A Symbolic Analysis of Relay and Switching Circuits online

A Symbolic Analysis of Relay and Switching Circuits is the title of a master's thesis written by computer science pioneer Claude E. Shannon while attending the Massachusetts Institute of Technology (MIT) in 1937, and then published in 1938. In his thesis, Shannon, a dual degree graduate of the University of Michigan, proved that Boolean algebra could be used to simplify the arrangement of the relays that were the building blocks of the electromechanical automatic telephone exchanges of the day. He went on to prove that it should also be possible to use arrangements of relays to solve Boolean algebra problems. His thesis laid the foundations for all digital computing and digital circuits.

The utilization of the binary properties of electrical switches to perform logic functions is the basic concept that underlies all electronic digital computer designs. Shannon's thesis became the foundation of practical digital circuit design when it became widely known among the electrical engineering community during and after World War II. At the time, the methods employed to design logic circuits (for example, contemporary Konrad Zuse's Z1) were ad hoc in nature and lacked the theoretical discipline that Shannon's paper supplied to later projects.

Shannon's work also differed significantly in its approach and theoretical framework compared to the work of Akira Nakashima. Whereas Shannon's approach and framework was abstract and based on mathematics, Nakashima tried to extend the existent circuit theory of the time to deal with relay circuits, and was reluctant to accept the mathematical and abstract model, favoring a grounded approach. Shannon's ideas broke new ground, with his abstract and modern approach dominating modern-day electrical engineering.

The paper is commonly regarded as the most important master's thesis ever due to its insights and influence. Pioneering computer scientist Herman Goldstine described Shannon's thesis as "surely ... one of the most important master's theses ever written ... It helped to change digital circuit design from an art to a science." In 1985, psychologist Howard Gardner called his thesis "possibly the most important, and also the most famous, master's thesis of the century". The paper won the 1939 Alfred Noble Prize.

A version of the paper was published in the 1938 issue of the Transactions of the American Institute of Electrical Engineers.
