= Betty Shannon =

American mathematician (1922–2017)

- Betty Shannon
- Born: Mary Elizabeth Moore; April 14, 1922; New York City, US
- Died: May 1, 2017 (aged 95); Lexington, Massachusetts, US
- Education: New Jersey College for Women
- Occupation: Researcher
- Employer: Bell Labs
- Spouse: Claude Shannon
- Children: 3

Betty Shannon (née Mary Elizabeth Moore) (April 14, 1922 – May 1, 2017) was an American mathematician and the main research collaborator of Claude Shannon. Betty inspired and assisted Claude in building some of his most famous inventions.

== Life ==
Mary Elizabeth Moore was born on April 14, 1922 in New York City to Vilma Ujlaky Moore and James E. Moore. She was awarded a full scholarship to the New Jersey College for Women, where she graduated Phi Beta Kappa after studying mathematics.

She worked as a numerical analyst at Bell Labs, where as a computer she supported work on microwaves, and then on radar. She published her own research on "Composing Music by a Stochastic Process"; an "exceptional" accomplishment in an era when it was a "significant and unusual achievement for a woman to get her name on a research report".

While at Bell Labs she met the shy and insular Claude Shannon. Claude "didn’t have much patience with people who weren’t as smart as he was" and the two of them got on well. In 1948, he asked her on a date and they ended up dining each night together; they were married in 1949.

In addition to her research, Shannon was a member of the Weavers' Guild of Boston, served as Dean of the Guild from 1976 to 1978 and received the Guild's Distinguished Achievement Award. In the 1970s, Betty combined her interest in handweaving with computing, experimenting with computer-controlled looms, but found she preferred a manual process.

Shannon had three children, Robert James Shannon, Andrew Moore Shannon, and Margarita Shannon, and raised their family in Winchester, Massachusetts. Her oldest son, Robert Shannon, died in 1998 at the age of 45. Betty died on May 1, 2017, at her home at Brookhaven in Lexington, Massachusetts.
