= Jimmy Soni =

American author and editor

- Born: Toulouse, France
- Education: Duke University (BA)
- Occupations: Author; columnist; editor
- Writing career
- Notable works: A Mind at Play, The Founders: The Story of Paypal and the Entrepreneurs Who Shaped Silicon Valley, Rome's Last Citizen

Jimmy Soni is an American author and former managing editor of The Huffington Post. He is best known for A Mind at Play, his biography of Claude Shannon and The Founders: The Story of Paypal and the Entrepreneurs Who Shaped Silicon Valley.

== Background ==
Soni was born in Toulouse, France to Indian parents from Rajasthan and was raised in Chicago, Illinois. He attended Duke University and graduated in 2007. During his time at Duke he was chairman of the honors council and vice president of student government.

== Career ==
Soni became the managing editor at The Huffington Post in January 2012. Previously he had worked as a strategy consultant at McKinsey and Company, as well as a speech writer at the office of the Mayor of the District of Columbia.

In 2012, Soni was named to AdWeek's "Young Influentials", a list of 20 people under 40 "who are wicked smart and rebooting your world". He was featured at a TEDx event held at Duke University in March 2012.

In May 2014, Soni transferred to India where he was in charge of launching the Huffington Post in the country. He left the company before the launch to focus on writing a book. Later, reports surfaced saying more than a book prompted his departure: internal complaints and a sexual harassment investigation of his management style were cited by current and former employees at the time. Arianna Huffington declined to comment on the matter.

In 2014, Forbes named Soni one of the 30 people under 30 years of age in the media. That same year the New York Observer listed him as the most "poachable" tech talent. Previously, Soni was named one of Crain Communications' 40 Under Forty talents.

In 2016, Soni worked with Eric Greitens on his successful campaign for governor in Missouri.

== Written works ==
Soni has co-authored several pieces with fellow Duke graduate Rob Goodman; their work has been featured in Politico, The Huffington Post, Business Insider, AdWeek, and The Atlantic, among others. In 2012, Thomas Dunne Books a division of St. Martin's Press, published their first book, a biography of Cato the Younger, titled Rome's Last Citizen: The Life and Legacy of Cato, Mortal Enemy of Caesar.

In 2017, Simon & Schuster published their biography of Claude Shannon, A Mind at Play: How Claude Shannon Invented the Information Age. The book received positive reviews from the Wall Street Journal, Financial Times, Nature and others. In an interview with the Institute of Electrical and Electronics Engineers, Soni explained that part of the reason he wrote A Mind at Play was that he was drawn to Shannon's personality and wanted to read a biography about him, but, "it turned out there wasn’t one."

The British Society for the History of Mathematics awarded Soni and Goodman their 2017 Neumann Prize for A Mind at Play.

In 2022, his second biography, The Founders: The Story of Paypal and the Entrepreneurs Who Shaped Silicon Valley, was published by Simon & Schuster.

== Bibliography ==
- Rome's Last Citizen: The Life and Legacy of Cato, Mortal Enemy of Caesar. New York: Thomas Dunne Books. 2012. ISBN 978-0312681234.
- A Mind at Play: How Claude Shannon Invented the Information Age. New York: Simon & Schuster. 2017. ISBN 978-1476766683.
- Jane's Carousel. New York: Phaidon Press. 2021. ISBN 978-1838661885.
- The Founders: The Story of Paypal and the Entrepreneurs Who Shaped Silicon Valle. New York: Simon & Schuster. 2022. ISBN 978-1501197260.
