= Claude Shannon =

American mathematician (1916–2001)

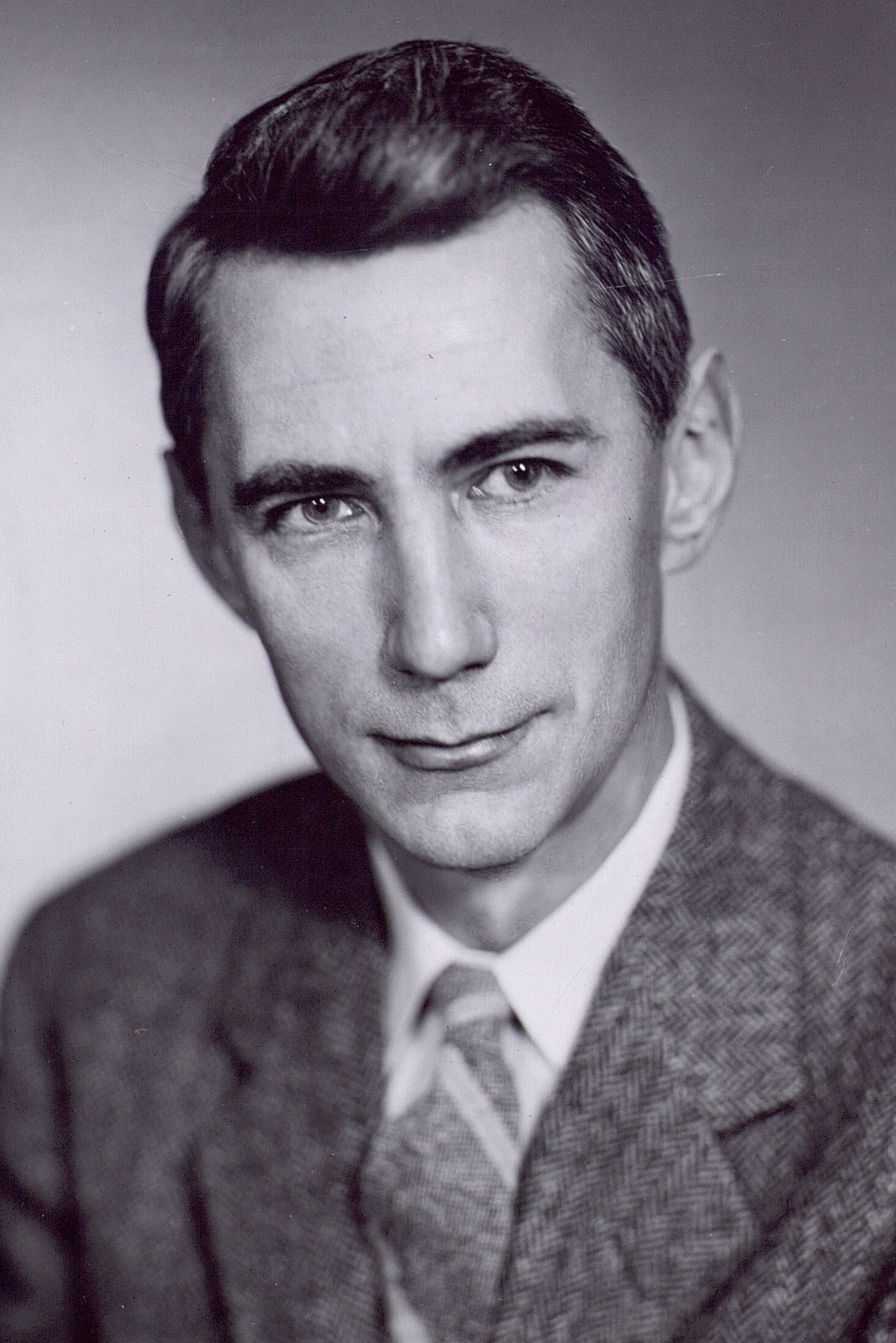
- Shannon c. 1956
- Born: Claude Shannon; April 30, 1916; Petoskey, Michigan, U.S.
- Died: February 24, 2001 (aged 84); Medford, Massachusetts, U.S.
- Education: University of Michigan (BS, BSE); Massachusetts Institute of Technology (MS, PhD)
- Known for: Information theory; Artificial intelligence; Boolean algebra; Binary code; Data compression; Digital electronics; Entropy in information theory; Logic gate; Pulse-code modulation; Sampling; Symmetric-key cryptography; Switching circuit theory; Units of information; Wearable computer
- Spouses: Norma Levor (m. 1940; div. 1941); Betty Shannon (m. 1949–2001)
- Awards: Alfred Noble Prize (1939); Morris Liebmann Memorial Prize (1949); Stuart Ballantine Medal (1955); IEEE Medal of Honor (1966); National Medal of Science (1966); Harvey Prize (1972); Claude E. Shannon Award (1973); Harold Pender Award (1978); John Fritz Medal (1983); Kyoto Prize (1985); Audio Engineering Society Gold Medal Award (1985); Marconi Society Lifetime Achievement Award (2000); National Inventors Hall of Fame (2004)
- Scientific career
- Fields: Mathematics, computer science, electronic engineering, artificial intelligence
- Workplaces: Bell Labs; Massachusetts Institute of Technology; Institute for Advanced Study
- Theses: A Symbolic Analysis of Relay and Switching Circuits (1937); An Algebra for Theoretical Genetics (1940)
- Doctoral advisor: Frank Lauren Hitchcock
- Doctoral students: Elwyn Berlekamp; Danny Hillis; Leonard Kleinrock; Ivan Sutherland; Bert Sutherland
- Other notable students: Chung Laung Liu; Irwin M. Jacobs

Claude Elwood Shannon (April 30, 1916 – February 24, 2001) was an American polymath who was a mathematician, electrical engineer, computer scientist, cryptographer, and inventor known as the "father of information theory" and is generally credited with laying the foundations of the Information Age.

Shannon was among the first to describe the use of Boolean algebra—essential to all digital electronic circuits—and helped found the field of artificial intelligence. The roboticist Rodney Brooks declared Shannon the 20th century engineer who contributed the most to 21st century technologies, and the mathematician Solomon W. Golomb described his intellectual achievement as "one of the greatest of the twentieth century".

At the University of Michigan, Shannon graduated with Bachelor of Science degrees in electrical engineering and mathematics, both in 1936. The following year, in his MIT electrical engineering master's thesis "A Symbolic Analysis of Relay and Switching Circuits", he demonstrated that electrical applications of Boolean algebra could construct any logical numerical relationship, thereby establishing the theory behind digital computing and digital circuits. Called by some the most important master's thesis of all time, it is the "birth certificate of the digital revolution", and started him in a lifetime of work that led him to win a Kyoto Prize in 1985. He graduated from MIT in 1940 with a PhD in mathematics; his thesis, which focused on genetics, contained important results though it remained unpublished and relatively unknown until recently.

Shannon contributed to the field of cryptanalysis for national defense of the United States during World War II, including his fundamental work on codebreaking and secure telecommunications, writing a paper which is considered one of the foundational pieces of modern cryptography, with his work described as "a turning point, and marked the closure of classical cryptography and the beginning of modern cryptography". His work was foundational for symmetric-key cryptography, including the work of Horst Feistel, the Data Encryption Standard (DES), and the Advanced Encryption Standard (AES). As a result, Shannon has been called the "founding father of modern cryptography".

His 1948 paper "A Mathematical Theory of Communication" laid the foundations for the field of information theory, referred to as a "blueprint for the digital era" by electrical engineer Robert G. Gallager and "the Magna Carta of the Information Age" by Scientific American. Golomb compared Shannon's influence on the digital age to that which "the inventor of the alphabet has had on literature". Shannon is also regarded as the most important post-1948 contributor to the theory. Advancements across multiple scientific disciplines utilized Shannon's theory—including the invention of the compact disc, the development of the Internet, the commercialization of mobile telephony, and the understanding of black holes. He formally introduced the term "bit", and was a co-inventor of both pulse-code modulation and the first wearable computer. He also invented the concept of a signal-flow graph and evaluation of the graph determinant.

Shannon joined the Central Intelligence Agency's Special Cryptologic Advisory Group in 1951. From 1956 to 1978, he was a professor at MIT. He also made numerous contributions to the field of artificial intelligence, including co-organizing the 1956 Dartmouth workshop, considered to be the discipline's founding event, and papers on the programming of chess computers. His Theseus machine was the first electrical device to learn by trial and error, being one of the first examples of artificial intelligence.

== Biography ==
=== Childhood ===
The Shannon family lived in Gaylord, Michigan. Claude was born in a hospital in nearby Petoskey. His father, Claude Sr. (1862–1934), was a businessman and, for a while, a judge of probate in Gaylord. His mother, Mabel Wolf Shannon (1880–1945), was a language teacher, who also served as the principal of Gaylord High School. Claude Sr. was a descendant of New Jersey settlers, while Mabel was a child of German immigrants. Shannon's family was active in their Methodist Church during his youth.

Claude Shannon c. 1932

Most of the first 16 years of Shannon's life were spent in Gaylord, where he attended public school, graduating from Gaylord High School in 1932. Shannon showed an inclination towards mechanical and electrical subjects. His best subjects were science and mathematics. At home, he constructed such devices as models of planes, a radio-controlled model boat and a barbed-wire telegraph system to a friend's house a half-mile away. While growing up, he also worked as a messenger for the Western Union company.

Shannon's childhood hero was Thomas Edison, who he later learned was a distant cousin: the two were descendants of John Ogden (1609–1682), a colonial leader and an ancestor of many distinguished people.

=== Logic circuits ===
In 1932, Shannon entered the University of Michigan, where he was introduced to the work of George Boole. He graduated in 1936 with two bachelor's degrees: one in electrical engineering and the other in mathematics.

In 1936, Shannon began his graduate studies in electrical engineering at the Massachusetts Institute of Technology (MIT), where he worked on Vannevar Bush's differential analyzer, which was an early analog computer that was composed of electromechanical parts and could solve differential equations. While studying the complicated ad hoc circuits of this analyzer, Shannon designed switching circuits based on Boole's concepts. In 1937, he wrote his master's degree thesis, A Symbolic Analysis of Relay and Switching Circuits, with a paper from this thesis published in 1938. A revolutionary work for switching circuit theory, in it Shannon diagramed switching circuits that could implement the essential operators of Boolean algebra. Then he proved that his switching circuits could be used to simplify the arrangement of the electromechanical relays that were used during that time in telephone call routing switches. Next, he expanded this concept, proving that these circuits could solve all problems that Boolean algebra could solve. In the last chapter, he presented diagrams of several circuits, including a digital 4-bit full adder. His work differed significantly from the work of previous engineers such as Akira Nakashima, who still relied on the existent circuit theory of the time and took a grounded approach. Shannon's ideas were more abstract and relied on mathematics, thereby breaking new ground with his work, with his approach dominating modern-day electrical engineering.

Using electrical switches to implement logic is the fundamental concept that underlies all electronic digital computers. Shannon's work became the foundation of digital circuit design, as it became widely known in the electrical engineering community during and after World War II. The theoretical rigor of Shannon's work superseded the ad hoc methods that had prevailed previously. In 1987, Howard Gardner hailed Shannon's thesis "possibly the most important, and also the most famous, master's thesis of the century." Herman Goldstine described it in 1972 as "surely ... one of the most important master's theses ever written ... It helped to change digital circuit design from an art to a science." One of the reviewers of his work commented that "To the best of my knowledge, this is the first application of the methods of symbolic logic to so practical an engineering problem. From the point of view of originality I rate the paper as outstanding." Shannon's master's thesis won the 1939 Alfred Noble Prize.

Shannon received his PhD in mathematics from MIT in 1940. Vannevar Bush had suggested that Shannon should work on his dissertation at the Cold Spring Harbor Laboratory, in order to develop a mathematical formulation for Mendelian genetics. This research resulted in Shannon's PhD thesis, called An Algebra for Theoretical Genetics. However, the thesis went unpublished after Shannon lost interest, but it did contain important results. Notably, he was one of the first to apply an algebraic framework to study theoretical population genetics. In addition, Shannon devised a general expression for the distribution of several linked traits in a population after multiple generations under a random mating system, which was original at the time, with the new theorem unworked out by other population geneticists of the time.

In 1940, Shannon became a National Research Fellow at the Institute for Advanced Study in Princeton, New Jersey. In Princeton, Shannon had the opportunity to discuss his ideas with influential scientists and mathematicians such as Hermann Weyl and John von Neumann, and he also had occasional encounters with Albert Einstein and Kurt Gödel. Shannon worked freely across disciplines, and this ability may have contributed to his later development of mathematical information theory.

=== Wartime research ===
Shannon had worked at Bell Labs for a few months in the summer of 1937, and returned there to work on fire-control systems and cryptography during World War II, under a contract with section D-2 (Control Systems section) of the National Defense Research Committee (NDRC).

Shannon is credited with the invention of signal-flow graphs, in 1942. He discovered the topological gain formula while investigating the functional operation of an analog computer.

For two months early in 1943, Shannon came into contact with the leading British mathematician Alan Turing. Turing had been posted to Washington to share with the U.S. Navy's cryptanalytic service the methods used by the Government Code and Cypher School at Bletchley Park to break the cyphers used by the Kriegsmarine U-boats in the north Atlantic Ocean. He was also interested in the encipherment of speech and to this end spent time at Bell Labs. Shannon and Turing met at teatime in the cafeteria. Turing showed Shannon his 1936 paper that defined what is now known as the "universal Turing machine". This impressed Shannon, as many of its ideas complemented his own.

Shannon and his team developed anti-aircraft systems that tracked enemy missiles and planes, while also determining the paths for intercepting missiles.

In 1945, as the war was coming to an end, the NDRC was issuing a summary of technical reports as a last step prior to its eventual closing down. Inside the volume on fire control, a special essay titled Data Smoothing and Prediction in Fire-Control Systems, coauthored by Shannon, Ralph Beebe Blackman, and Hendrik Wade Bode, formally treated the problem of smoothing the data in fire-control by analogy with "the problem of separating a signal from interfering noise in communications systems."

Shannon's work on cryptography was even more closely related to his later publications on communication theory. At the close of the war, he prepared a classified memorandum for Bell Telephone Labs entitled "A Mathematical Theory of Cryptography", dated September 1945. A declassified version of this paper was published in 1949 as "Communication Theory of Secrecy Systems" in the Bell System Technical Journal. This paper incorporated many of the concepts and mathematical formulations that also appeared in his A Mathematical Theory of Communication. Shannon said that his wartime insights into communication theory and cryptography developed simultaneously, and that "they were so close together you couldn't separate them". In a footnote near the beginning of the classified report, Shannon announced his intention to "develop these results ... in a forthcoming memorandum on the transmission of information."

While he was at Bell Labs, Shannon proved that the cryptographic one-time pad is unbreakable in his classified research that was later published in 1949. The same article also proved that any unbreakable system must have essentially the same characteristics as the one-time pad: the key must be truly random, as large as the plaintext, never reused in whole or part, and kept secret.

=== Information theory ===
In 1948, the promised memorandum appeared as "A Mathematical Theory of Communication", an article in two parts in the July and October issues of the Bell System Technical Journal. This work focuses on the problem of how best to encode the message a sender wants to transmit. Shannon developed information entropy as a measure of the information content in a message, which is a measure of uncertainty reduced by the message. In so doing, he essentially invented the field of information theory.

The book The Mathematical Theory of Communication reprints Shannon's 1948 article and Warren Weaver's popularization of it, which is accessible to the non-specialist. Weaver pointed out that the word "information" in communication theory is not related to what you do say, but to what you could say. That is, information is a measure of one's freedom of choice when one selects a message. Shannon's concepts were also popularized, subject to his own proofreading, in John Robinson Pierce's Symbols, Signals, and Noise.

Information theory's fundamental contribution to natural language processing and computational linguistics was further established in 1951, in his article "Prediction and Entropy of Printed English", showing upper and lower bounds of entropy on the statistics of English – giving a statistical foundation to language analysis. In addition, he proved that treating space as the 27th letter of the alphabet actually lowers uncertainty in written language, providing a clear quantifiable link between cultural practice and probabilistic cognition.

Another notable paper published in 1949 is "Communication Theory of Secrecy Systems", a declassified version of his wartime work on the mathematical theory of cryptography, in which he proved that all theoretically unbreakable cyphers must have the same requirements as the one-time pad. He is credited with the introduction of sampling theorem, which he had derived as early as 1940, and which is concerned with representing a continuous-time signal from a (uniform) discrete set of samples. This theory was essential in enabling telecommunications to move from analog to digital transmissions systems in the 1960s and later. He further wrote a paper in 1956 regarding coding for a noisy channel, which also became a classic paper in the field of information theory. However, also in 1956 he wrote a one-page editorial for the "IRE Transactions on Information Theory" entitled "The Bandwagon" which he began by observing: "Information theory has, in the last few years, become something of a scientific bandwagon" and which he concluded by warning: "Only by maintaining a thoroughly scientific attitude can we achieve real progress in communication theory and consolidate our present position."

Claude Shannon's influence has been immense in the field, for example, in a 1973 collection of the key papers in the field of information theory, he was author or coauthor of 12 of the 49 papers cited, while no one else appeared more than three times. Even beyond his original paper in 1948, he is still regarded as the most important post-1948 contributor to the theory.

In May 1951, Mervin Kelly received a request from the director of the CIA, general Walter Bedell Smith, regarding Shannon and the need for him, as Shannon was regarded as, based on "the best authority", the "most eminently qualified scientist in the particular field concerned". As a result of the request, Shannon became part of the CIA's Special Cryptologic Advisory Group or SCAG.

In his time at Bell Labs, he also co-developed pulse-code modulation alongside Bernard M. Oliver, and John R. Pierce.

=== Artificial intelligence ===
Shannon and his electromechanical mouse Theseus (named after Theseus from Greek mythology) which he tried to have solve the maze in one of the first experiments in artificial intelligence

==== Theseus, the mouse ====
In 1950, Shannon designed and built, with the help of his wife, Betty, a learning machine named Theseus. It consisted of a maze on a surface, through which a mechanical mouse could move. Below the surface were sensors (an electromechanical relay circuit) that followed the path of a mechanical mouse through the maze. The mouse was designed to search through the corridors until it found the target. Having travelled through the maze, the mouse could then be placed anywhere it had been before, and because of its prior experience it could go directly to the target. If placed in unfamiliar territory, it was programmed to search until it reached a known location and then it would proceed to the target, adding the new knowledge to its memory and learning new behavior. After much trial and error, this device would learn the shortest path through the maze, and direct the mechanical mouse through the maze. The pattern of the maze could be changed at will, by rearranging movable partitions. Shannon's mouse appears to have been the first artificial learning device of its kind.

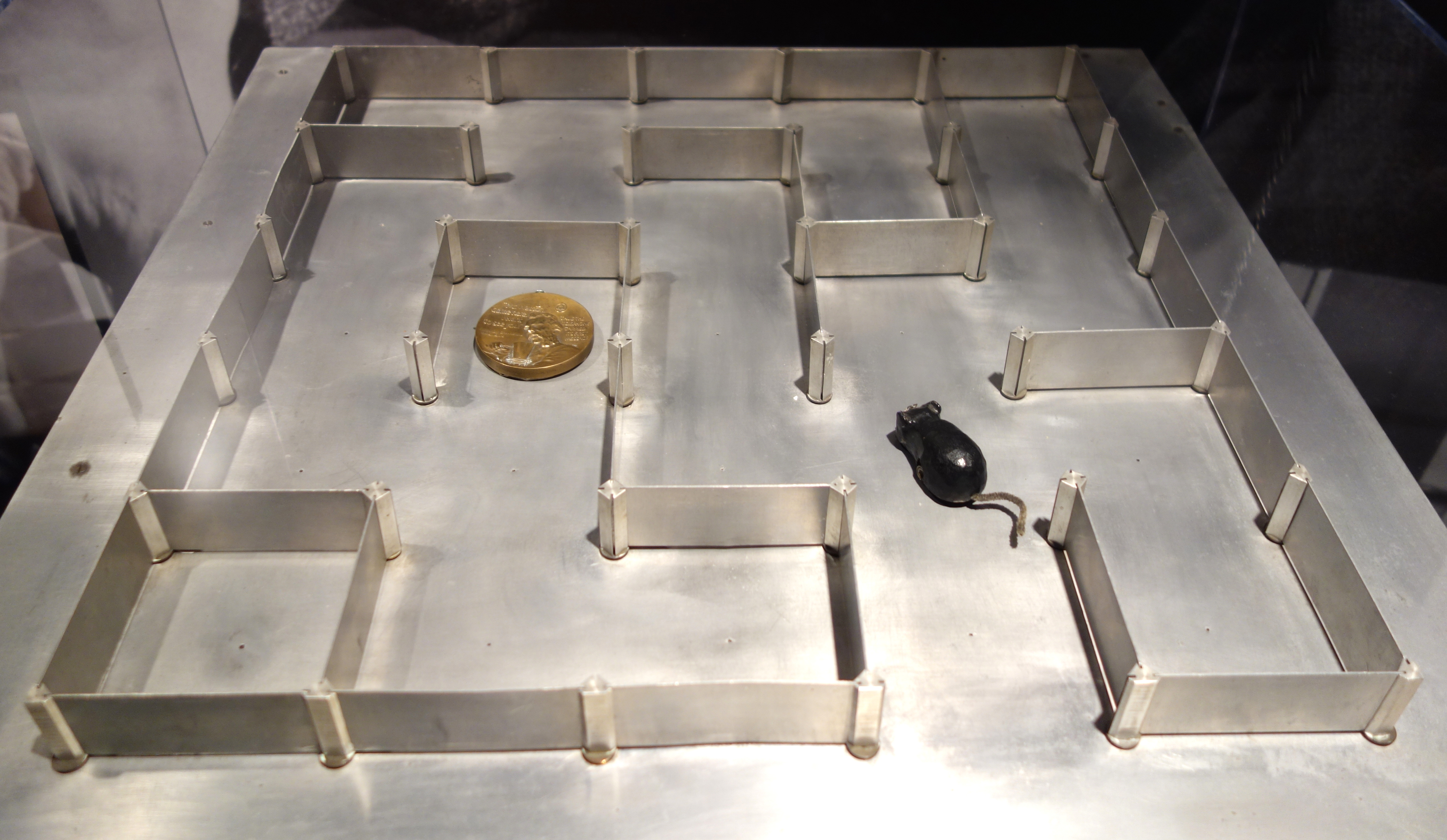
Theseus Maze in MIT Museum

Mazin Gilbert stated that Theseus "inspired the whole field of AI. This random trial and error is the foundation of artificial intelligence."

==== Other artificial intelligence work ====
Shannon wrote multiple influential papers on artificial intelligence, such as his 1950 paper titled "Programming a Computer for Playing Chess", and his 1953 paper titled "Computers and Automata". Alongside John McCarthy, he co-edited a book titled Automata Studies, which was published in 1956. The categories in the articles within the volume were influenced by Shannon's own subject headings in his 1953 paper. Shannon shared McCarthy's goal of creating a science of intelligent machines, but also held a broader view of viable approaches in automata studies, such as neural nets, Turing machines, cybernetic mechanisms, and symbolic processing by computer.

Shannon co-organized and participated in the Dartmouth workshop of 1956, alongside John McCarthy, Marvin Minsky and Nathaniel Rochester, and which is considered the founding event of the field of artificial intelligence.

=== Teaching at MIT ===
In 1956 Shannon joined the MIT faculty, holding an endowed chair. He worked in the Research Laboratory of Electronics (RLE). He continued to serve on the MIT faculty until 1978.

=== Later life ===
Shannon developed Alzheimer's disease and spent the last few years of his life in a nursing home. He died in 2001, survived by his wife, a son and daughter, and two granddaughters.

=== Hobbies and inventions ===
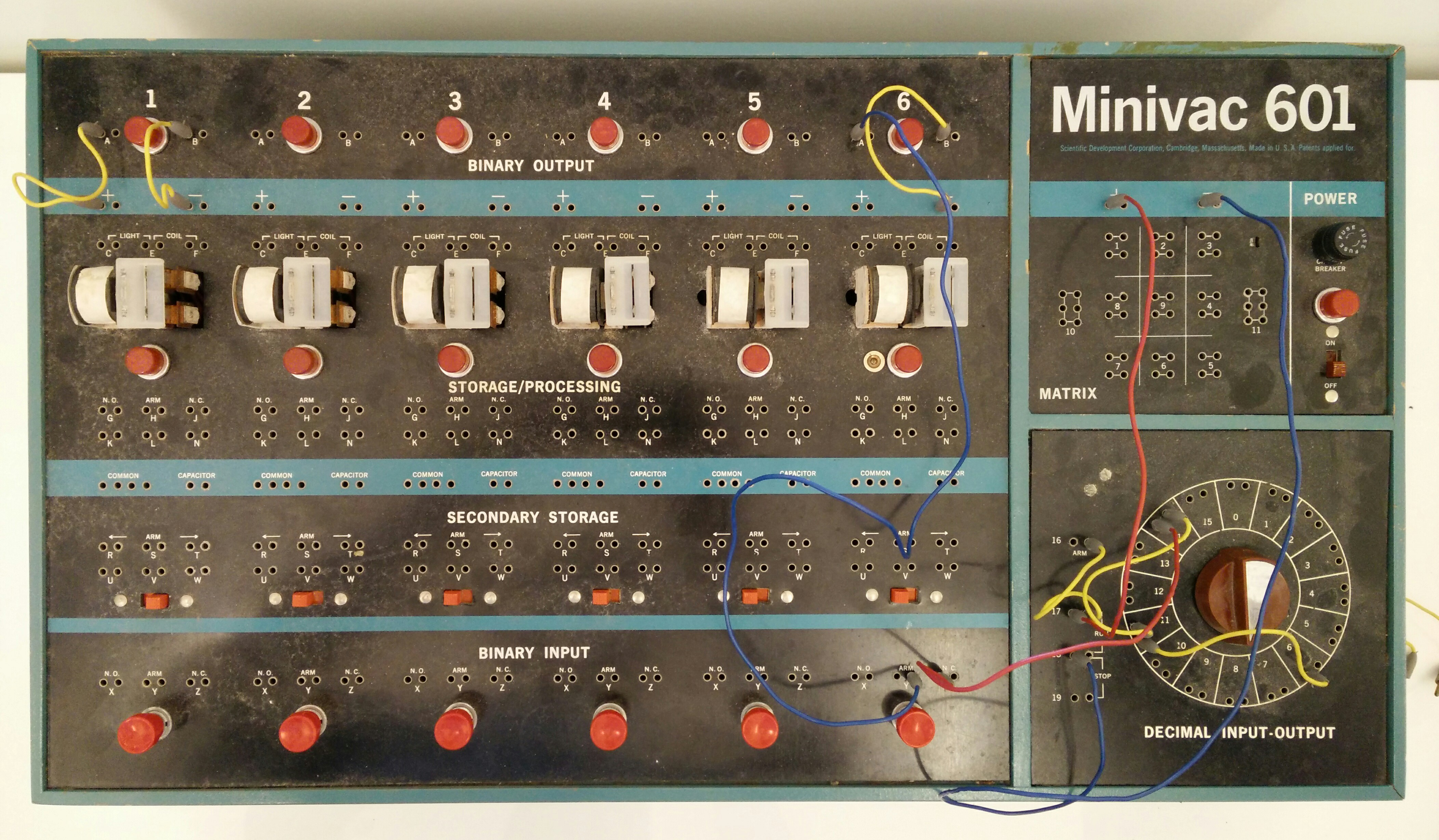
The Minivac 601, a digital computer trainer designed by Shannon

Outside of Shannon's academic pursuits, he was interested in juggling, unicycling, and chess. He also invented many devices, including a Roman numeral computer called THROBAC, and juggling machines. He built a device that could solve the Rubik's Cube puzzle.

Shannon also invented flame-throwing trumpets, rocket-powered frisbees, and plastic foam shoes for navigating a lake, by wearing which it would appear to an observer as if Shannon were walking on water.

Shannon designed the Minivac 601, a digital computer trainer to teach business people about how computers functioned. It was sold by the Scientific Development Corp starting in 1961.

He is further considered the co-inventor of the first wearable computer along with Edward O. Thorp. The device was used to improve the odds when playing roulette.

=== Personal life ===
Shannon married Norma Levor, a Jewish journalist and screenwriter, in January 1940. The marriage ended in divorce a year later. Levor later married Ben Barzman.

Shannon met his second wife, Mary Elizabeth Moore (Betty), when she was a numerical analyst at Bell Labs. They were married in 1949. Betty assisted Claude in building some of his most famous inventions. They had three children.

Shannon presented himself as apolitical and an atheist.

=== Tributes and legacy ===
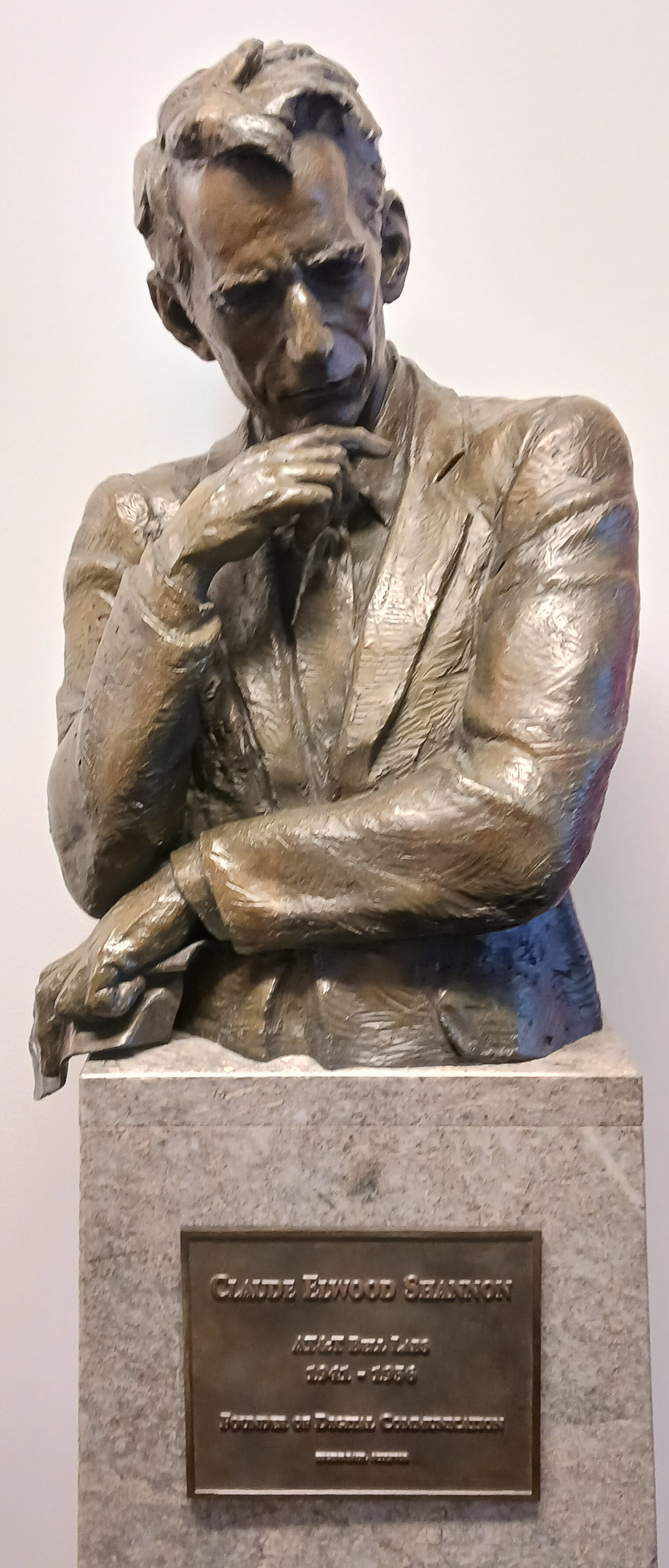
Statue of Claude Shannon at AT&T Shannon Labs

There are six statues of Shannon sculpted by Eugene Daub: one at the University of Michigan; one at MIT in the Laboratory for Information and Decision Systems; one in Gaylord, Michigan; one at the University of California, San Diego; one at Bell Labs; and another at AT&T Shannon Labs. The statue in Gaylord is located in the Claude Shannon Memorial Park. After the breakup of the Bell System, the part of Bell Labs that remained with AT&T Corporation was named Shannon Labs in his honor.

In June 1954, Shannon was listed by Fortune as one of the top 20 most important scientists in America. In 2013, information theory was listed as one of the top 10 revolutionary scientific theories by Science News.

According to Neil Sloane, an AT&T Fellow who co-edited Shannon's large collection of papers in 1993, the perspective introduced by Shannon's communication theory (now called "information theory") is the foundation of the digital revolution, and every device containing a microprocessor or microcontroller is a conceptual descendant of Shannon's publication in 1948: "He's one of the great men of the century. Without him, none of the things we know today would exist. The whole digital revolution started with him." The cryptocurrency unit shannon (a synonym for gwei, one billion wei) is named after him.

Shannon is credited by many as single-handedly creating information theory and for laying the foundations for the Digital Age.

His achievements are considered to be on par with those of Albert Einstein, Sir Isaac Newton, and Charles Darwin.

A Mind at Play, a biography of Shannon written by Jimmy Soni and Rob Goodman, was published in 2017. They described Shannon as "the most important genius you've never heard of, a man whose intellect was on par with Albert Einstein and Isaac Newton". Consultant and writer Tom Rutledge, writing for Boston Review, stated that "Of the computer pioneers who drove the mid-20th-century information technology revolution—an elite men's club of scholar-engineers who also helped crack Nazi codes and pinpoint missile trajectories—Shannon may have been the most brilliant of them all." Electrical engineer Robert Gallager stated about Shannon that "He had this amazing clarity of vision. Einstein had it, too – this ability to take on a complicated problem and find the right way to look at it, so that things become very simple." In an obituary by Neil Sloane and Robert Calderbank, they stated that "Shannon must rank near the top of the list of major figures of twentieth century science". Due to his work in multiple fields, Shannon is also regarded as a polymath.

Historian James Gleick noted the importance of Shannon, stating that "Einstein looms large, and rightly so. But we're not living in the relativity age, we're living in the information age. It's Shannon whose fingerprints are on every electronic device we own, every computer screen we gaze into, every means of digital communication. He's one of these people who so transform the world that, after the transformation, the old world is forgotten." Gleick further noted that "he created a whole field from scratch, from the brow of Zeus".

On April 30, 2016, Shannon was honored with a Google Doodle to celebrate his life on what would have been his 100th birthday.

The Bit Player, a feature film about Shannon directed by Mark Levinson premiered at the World Science Festival in 2019. Drawn from interviews conducted with Shannon in his house in the 1980s, the film was released on Amazon Prime in August 2020.

Claude, the large language model developed by artificial intelligence research company Anthropic, is partially named in honor of Shannon.

== The Mathematical Theory of Communication ==
=== Weaver's contribution ===
Shannon's The Mathematical Theory of Communication, begins with an interpretation of his own work by Warren Weaver. Although Shannon's entire work is about communication itself, Warren Weaver communicated his ideas in such a way that those not acclimated to complex theory and mathematics could comprehend the fundamental laws he put forth. The coupling of their unique communicational abilities and ideas generated the Shannon-Weaver model, although the mathematical and theoretical underpinnings emanate entirely from Shannon's work after Weaver's introduction. For the layman, Weaver's introduction better communicates The Mathematical Theory of Communication, but Shannon's subsequent logic, mathematics, and expressive precision was responsible for defining the problem itself.

== Other work ==
=== Shannon's estimate for the complexity of chess ===
In 1949 Shannon completed a paper (published in March 1950) which estimates the game-tree complexity of chess, which is approximately 10^{120}. This number is now often referred to as the "Shannon number", and is still regarded today as an accurate estimate of the game's complexity. The number is often cited as one of the barriers to solving the game of chess using an exhaustive analysis (i.e. brute force analysis).

=== Shannon's computer chess program ===
On March 9, 1949, Shannon presented a paper called "Programming a Computer for playing Chess". The paper was presented at the National Institute for Radio Engineers Convention in New York. He described how to program a computer to play chess based on position scoring and move selection. He proposed basic strategies for restricting the number of possibilities to be considered in a game of chess. In March 1950 it was published in Philosophical Magazine, and is considered one of the first articles published on the topic of programming a computer for playing chess, and using a computer to solve the game. In 1950, Shannon wrote an article titled "A Chess-Playing Machine", which was published in Scientific American. Both papers have had immense influence and laid the foundations for future chess programs.

His process for having the computer decide on which move to make was a minimax procedure, based on an evaluation function of a given chess position. Shannon gave a rough example of an evaluation function in which the value of the black position was subtracted from that of the white position. Material was counted according to the usual chess piece relative value (1 point for a pawn, 3 points for a knight or bishop, 5 points for a rook, and 9 points for a queen). He considered some positional factors, subtracting ½ point for each doubled pawn, backward pawn, and isolated pawn; mobility was incorporated by adding 0.1 point for each legal move available.

=== Shannon's maxim ===
Shannon formulated a version of Kerckhoffs' principle as "The enemy knows the system". In this form it is known as "Shannon's maxim".

=== Miscellaneous ===
Shannon also contributed to combinatorics and detection theory. His 1948 paper introduced many tools used in combinatorics. He did work on detection theory in 1944, with his work being one of the earliest expositions of the "matched filter" principle.

He was known as a successful investor who gave lectures on investing. A report from Barron's on August 11, 1986, detailed the recent performance of 1,026 mutual funds, and Shannon achieved a higher return than 1,025 of them. Comparing the portfolio of Shannon from the late 1950s to 1986, to Warren Buffett's of 1965 to 1995, Shannon had a return of about 28%, compared to 27% for Buffett. One such method of Shannon's was labeled Shannon's demon, which was to form a portfolio of equal parts cash and a stock, and rebalance regularly to take advantage of the stock's randomly jittering price movements. Shannon reportedly long thought of publishing about investing, but ultimately did not, despite giving multiple lectures. He was one of the first investors to download stock prices, and a snapshot of his portfolio in 1981 was found to be $582,717.50, translating to $1.5 million in 2015, excluding another one of his stocks.

== Commemorations ==
=== Shannon centenary ===
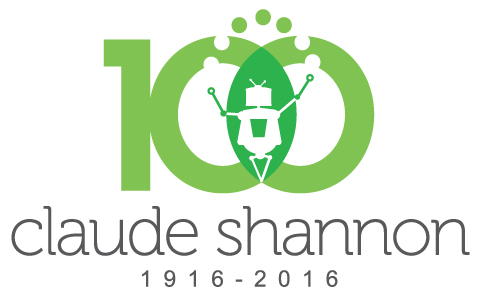
Claude Shannon centenary

The Shannon centenary, 2016, marked the life and influence of Shannon on the hundredth anniversary of his birth on April 30, 1916. It was inspired in part by the Alan Turing Year. An ad hoc committee of the IEEE Information Theory Society including Christina Fragouli, Rüdiger Urbanke, Michelle Effros, Lav Varshney and Sergio Verdú, coordinated worldwide events. The initiative was announced in the History Panel at the 2015 IEEE Information Theory Workshop Jerusalem and the IEEE Information Theory Society newsletter.

A detailed listing of confirmed events was available on the website of the IEEE Information Theory Society.

Some of the activities included:

- Bell Labs hosted the First Shannon Conference on the Future of the Information Age on April 28–29, 2016, in Murray Hill, New Jersey, to celebrate Shannon and the continued impact of his legacy on society. The event includes keynote speeches by global luminaries and visionaries of the information age who will explore the impact of information theory on society and our digital future, informal recollections, and leading technical presentations on subsequent related work in other areas such as bioinformatics, economic systems, and social networks. There is also a student competition
- Bell Labs launched a web exhibit on April 30, 2016, chronicling Shannon's hiring at Bell Labs (under an NDRC contract with US Government), his subsequent work there from 1942 through 1957, and details of Mathematics Department. The exhibit also displayed bios of colleagues and managers during his tenure, as well as original versions of some of the technical memoranda which subsequently became well known in published form.
- The Republic of Macedonia issued a commemorative stamp. A USPS commemorative stamp is being proposed, with an active petition.
- A documentary on Shannon and on the impact of information theory, The Bit Player, was produced by Sergio Verdú and Mark Levinson.
- A trans-Atlantic celebration of both George Boole's bicentenary and Shannon's centenary that is being led by University College Cork and the Massachusetts Institute of Technology. A first event was a workshop in Cork, When Boole Meets Shannon, and will continue with exhibits at the Boston Museum of Science and at the MIT Museum.
- Many organizations around the world are holding observance events, including the Boston Museum of Science, the Heinz-Nixdorf Museum, the Institute for Advanced Study, Technische Universität Berlin, University of South Australia (UniSA), Unicamp (Universidade Estadual de Campinas), University of Toronto, Chinese University of Hong Kong, Cairo University, Telecom ParisTech, National Technical University of Athens, Indian Institute of Science, Indian Institute of Technology Bombay, Indian Institute of Technology Kanpur, Nanyang Technological University of Singapore, University of Maryland, University of Illinois at Chicago, École Polytechnique Federale de Lausanne, The Pennsylvania State University (Penn State), University of California Los Angeles, Massachusetts Institute of Technology, Chongqing University of Posts and Telecommunications, and University of Illinois at Urbana-Champaign.
- A logo that appears on this page was crowdsourced on Crowdspring.
- The Math Encounters presentation of May 4, 2016, at the National Museum of Mathematics in New York, titled Saving Face: Information Tricks for Love and Life, focused on Shannon's work in information theory. A video recording and other material are available.

== Awards and honors list ==
The Claude E. Shannon Award was established in his honor; he was also its first recipient, in 1973.

- Stuart Ballantine Medal of the Franklin Institute, 1955
- Member of the American Academy of Arts and Sciences, 1957
- Harvey Prize, the Technion of Haifa, Israel, 1972
- Alfred Noble Prize, 1939 (award of civil engineering societies in the US)
- National Medal of Science, 1966, presented by President Lyndon B. Johnson
- Kyoto Prize, 1985
- Morris Liebmann Memorial Prize of the Institute of Radio Engineers, 1949
- United States National Academy of Sciences, 1956
- Medal of Honor of the Institute of Electrical and Electronics Engineers, 1966
- Golden Plate Award of the American Academy of Achievement, 1967
- Royal Netherlands Academy of Arts and Sciences (KNAW), foreign member, 1975
- Member of the American Philosophical Society, 1983
- Member of the Royal Irish Academy, 1985
- Member of the US National Academy of Engineering (1985)
- Basic Research Award, Eduard Rhein Foundation, Germany, 1991
- Marconi Society Lifetime Achievement Award, 2000
- Donner Professor of Science, MIT, 1958–1979
- Asteroid 18838 Shannon

== Selected works ==
- Claude E. Shannon: A Symbolic Analysis of Relay and Switching Circuits, master's thesis, MIT, 1937.
- Claude E. Shannon: "A Mathematical Theory of Communication", Bell System Technical Journal, Vol. 27, pp. 379–423, 623–656, 1948 (abstract).
- Claude E. Shannon and Warren Weaver: The Mathematical Theory of Communication. The University of Illinois Press, Urbana, Illinois, 1949. ISBN 0-252-72548-4
- Neil Sloane editor (1993) Claude Shannon: Collected Works, IEEE Press

== See also ==
- Entropy power inequality
- Error-correcting codes with feedback
- List of pioneers in computer science
- Models of communication
- n-gram
- Noisy channel coding theorem
- Nyquist–Shannon sampling theorem
- One-time pad
- Product cipher
- Pulse-code modulation
- Rate distortion theory
- Sampling
- Shannon capacity
- Shannon entropy
- Shannon index
- Shannon multigraph
- Shannon security
- Shannon switching game
- Shannon–Fano coding
- Shannon–Hartley law
- Shannon–Hartley theorem
- Shannon's expansion
- Shannon's source coding theorem
- Shannon-Weaver model of communication
- Whittaker–Shannon interpolation formula
