= The Idea Factory =

Non-fiction book by Jon Gertner

The Idea Factory: Bell Labs and the Great Age of American Innovation
- First edition
- Author: Jon Gertner
- Language: English
- Subject: Bell Labs
- Genre: Corporate history
- Publisher: Penguin Press
- Publication date: March 15, 2012
- Publication place: United States
- Media type: Print (hardcover), print (paperback), e-book, audiobook
- Pages: 432
- ISBN: 9781594203282

The Idea Factory: Bell Labs and the Great Age of American Innovation is a 2012 book by Jon Gertner that describes the history of Bell Labs, the research and development wing of AT&T, as well as many of its personalities, including Claude Shannon and William Shockley.

== Reception ==
The New York Times said that Gertner's "portraits of Kelly and the cadre of talented scientists who worked at Bell Labs are animated by a journalistic ability to make their discoveries and inventions utterly comprehensible".

The Idea Factory was reviewed favorably by Foreign Policy, the New York Times, the Cleveland Plain-Dealer and others. Three adapted excerpts from the book were published in TIME.

Facebook co-founder and chief executive officer Mark Zuckerberg recommended The Idea Factory to his book club in 2015, saying of the choice, "[he is] very interested in what causes innovation — what kinds of people, questions and environments."
