= Christina Fragouli =

American electrical engineer

Christina Fragouli, from the University of California, Los Angeles, was named Fellow of the Institute of Electrical and Electronics Engineers (IEEE) in 2016 for contributions to network coding.
