= Shannon capacity =

Shannon capacity may mean

- Channel capacity, the capacity of a channel in communications theory
- Shannon capacity of a graph
