= Akira Nakashima =

Japanese electrical engineer

Akira Nakashima

Akira Nakashima (中嶋 章 or 中島 章, also written as Nakashima Akira, Nakasima Akira or Nakajima Akira, 5 January 1908 – 29 October 1970) was a Japanese electrical engineer of the NEC.

He received a bachelor's degree in electrical engineering from the Imperial University of Tokyo.

Akira Nakashima independently introduced switching circuit theory in papers from 1934 to 1936, concurrent with Victor Shestakov and Claude Shannon, laying the foundations for digital circuit design, in digital computers and other areas of modern technology. However, Shannon's ideas were markedly different in approach and theoretical framework compared to the work of Nakashima, whose work was still based on the existent circuit theory of the time and took a grounded approach, whereas Shannon based his work on mathematics and was far more abstract, thereby breaking new ground and setting up an approach that now dominates modern electrical engineering.
