= Booleo =

Card game

Booleo (stylized bOOleO) is a strategy card game using boolean logic gates. It was developed by Jonathan Brandt and Chris Kampf with Sean P. Dennis in 2008, and it was first published by Tessera Games LLC in 2009.

== Game ==
The deck consists of 64 cards:

- 48 "Gate" cards using three Boolean operators AND, OR, and XOR

8 OR cards resolving to 1
8 OR cards resolving to 0
8 AND cards resolving to 1
8 AND cards resolving to 0
8 XOR cards resolving to 1
8 XOR cards resolving to 0

- 8 NOT cards

- 6 Initial Binary cards, each displaying a 0 and a 1 aligned to the two short ends of the card

- 2 Truth Tables (used for reference, not in play)

== Play ==
Starting with a line of Initial Binary cards laid perpendicular to two facing players, the object of the game is to be the first to complete a logical pyramid whose final output corresponds to the input from the sequence of Initial Binary cards facing that player.

The game is played in "draw one play one” format. The pyramid consists of decreasing rows of gate cards, where the outputs of any contiguous pair of cards comprise the input values to a single card in the following row. The pyramid, therefore, has Initial Binary values as its base and tapers to a single card closest to the player. By tracing the "flow" of values through any series of gate, every card placed in the pyramid must make "logical sense", i.e. the inputs and output value of every gate card must conform to the rule of that gate card.

The NOT cards are played against any of the Initial Binary cards in play, causing that card to be rotated 180 degrees, "flipping" the value of that card from 0 to 1 or vice versa.

By changing the value of any the sequence of Initial Binary cards, any and all gate cards which "flow" from it must be re-evaluated to ensure its placement makes "logical sense". If it does not, that gate card is removed from the player's pyramid.

Since both players' pyramids share the Initial Binary cards as a base, "flipping" an Initial Binary has an effect on both players' pyramids (by playing a NOT card). A principal strategy during game play is to invalidate gate cards in the opponent's logic pyramid while rendering as little damage to one's own pyramid in the process. However, an opponent may cancel the effects that a NOT card would have on the Initial Binary sequence, by interrupting their opponent with a NOT card of their own.

Some logic gates are more robust than others to a change to their inputs. Therefore, not all logic gate cards have the same strategic value.

The standard edition of the game does not contain NAND, NOR, or XNOR gates, but these are found in the compatible upgrade (which is also a standalone game with identical premise).

== Variations ==
The number of cards in Booleo will comfortably support a match between two players whose logic pyramids are six cards wide at their base. By combining decks, it is possible to construct larger pyramids or to have matches among more than two players. For example:

- Four players may play individually or as facing teams by arranging a cross of Initial Binary cards, where four logic pyramids extend like compass points in four directions
- Four or more players may build partially overlapping pyramids from a long base of Initial Binary cards

Tessera Games also published bOOleO-N Edition, which is identical to Booleo with the exception that it uses the inverse set of logic gates: NAND, NOR, and XNOR. bOOleO-N Edition may be played on its own, or it may be combined with Booleo.
