= Victor Shestakov =

- Born: 1907; Moscow
- Died: 1987 (aged 79–80)
- Education: Moscow State University
- Scientific career
- Fields: Mathematics, Engineering
- Doctoral advisor: Valery Glivenko

Victor Ivanovich Shestakov (Russian: Виктор Иванович Шестаков) (1907–1987) was a Russian/Soviet logician and theoretician of electrical engineering. In 1935 he discovered the possible interpretation of Boolean algebra of logic in electro-mechanical relay circuits. He graduated from Moscow State University (1934) and worked there in the General Physics Department almost until his death.

Shestakov proposed a theory of electric switches based on Boolean logic earlier than Claude Shannon (according to certification of Soviet logicians and mathematicians Sofya Yanovskaya, M. G. Gaaze-Rapoport, Roland Dobrushin, Oleg Lupanov, Yu. A. Gastev, Yu. T. Medvedev, and Vladimir Andreevich Uspensky). However, both Shestakov and Shannon defended their theses the same year (1938), and the first publication of Shestakov's result took place only in 1941 (in Russian).

In the early 20th century, relay circuits began to be more widely used in automatics, defense of electric and communications systems. Every relay circuit schema for practical use was a distinct invention, because the general principle of simulation of these systems was not known. Shestakov's credit (and independently later Claude Shannon's) is the general theory of logical simulation, inspired by the rapidly increasing complexity of technical demands. Logical simulation requires solid mathematical foundations. Namely these foundations were originally established by Shestakov.

Shestakov set forth an algebraic logic model of electrical two-pole switches (later three- and four-pole switches) with series and parallel connections of schematic elements (resistors, capacitors, magnets, inductive coils, etc.). Resistance of these elements could take arbitrary values on the real-number line, and upon the two-element set {0, ∞} this degenerates into the bivalent Boolean algebra of logic.

Shestakov may be considered as a forerunner of combinatorial logic and its application (and, hence, Boolean algebra of logic as well) in electric engineering, the 'language' of which is broad enough to simulate non-electrical objects of any conceivable physical nature. He was a pioneer of study of merged continual algebraic logic (parametrical) and topological (structural) models.

== See also ==
- List of pioneers in computer science
- Boolean differential calculus
