= Lecithocera mazina =

Scientific classification
- Kingdom: Animalia
- Phylum: Arthropoda
- Class: Insecta
- Order: Lepidoptera
- Family: Lecithoceridae
- Genus: Lecithocera
- Species: L. mazina

Binomial name
- Lecithocera mazina Meyrick, 1910

Species of moth in the genus Lecithocera

Lecithocera mazina is a moth in the family Lecithoceridae. It was described by Edward Meyrick in 1910. It is found in the Punjab region of what was British India.

The wingspan is about 14 mm. The forewings are light greyish ochreous closely irrorated (sprinkled) with fuscous. The hindwings are pale fuscous.
