= Māzin Mubārak =

Syrian linguist (1930–2026)

- مازن المبارك
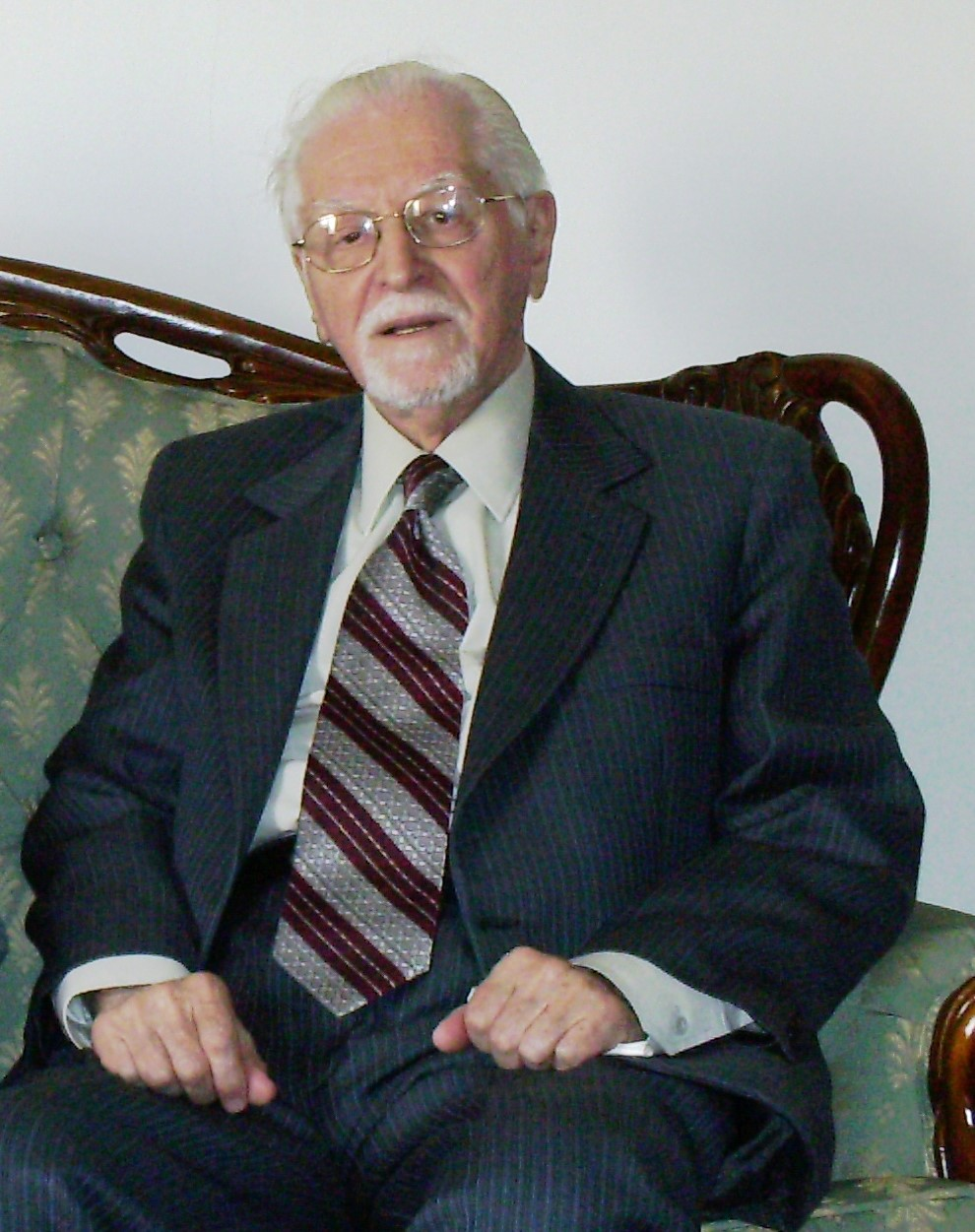
- Mubārak in 2010
- Born: Abu Zaher Mazin ibn Abd al-Qadir ibn Muhammad ibn Muhammad al-Tayyib al-Mubarak; 28 November 1930; Damascus, Syria
- Died: 25 July 2026 (aged 95); Damascus, Syria
- Occupations: Linguist, scholar
- Employer(s): Damascus University; King Saud University; Qatar University; Arabic Language Academy of Damascus
- Known for: Contributions to Arabic grammar, Arabic linguistic heritage
- Parent: Abd al-Qadir al-Mubarak (father)
- Awards: King Salman International Academy for Arabic Language Award (2025)

Māzin Mubārak (Arabic: مازن المبارك; 28 November 1930 – 25 July 2026) was a Syrian linguist, scholar and academic. He served as a professor at Damascus University and held positions in many universities, including King Saud University and Qatar University. Mubarak was a member of the Arabic Language Academy of Damascus. In 2025, he won the King Salman International Academy for Arabic Language Award.

== Early life and education ==
Abu Zaher Mazin ibn Abd al-Qadir ibn Muhammad ibn Muhammad al-Tayyib al-Mubarak was born in Damascus on 28 November 1930. He was the son of Abdul Qadir Al-Mubarak, founder of Arab Academy of Damascus. His older brother, Muhammad al-Mubarak, is a scholar and minister.

Mubārak studied his primary and secondary local school in Damascus before entering Damascus University. In 1952, he graduated with Bachelor of Arts in literature. He also got a diploma in education teachings from the Higher Teachers' Institute. He was sent on a mission to Cairo University in 1954. He then earned his Master's degree in 1957. In 1960, He went on to receive his Doctorate in Literature from Cairo University.

== Career ==
Mubārak started his career for the education. After completing his doctorate in Cairo in 1960, he returned to Damascus, where he joined the Faculty of Arts at Damascus University. He held many positions there, serving as a professor in the Department of Arabic Language, Chair of the Department, and later as the Dean of the Faculty of Arts. He served as a visiting professor and lecturer at several institutions, including King Saud University, Qatar University,Lebanese University, and the College of Islamic and Arabic Studies in Dubai. He was elected a full member of the Arabic Language Academy of Damascus. He participated in many scientific committees. He was also among the founding members of the Arab Writers Union in Syria.

== Death ==
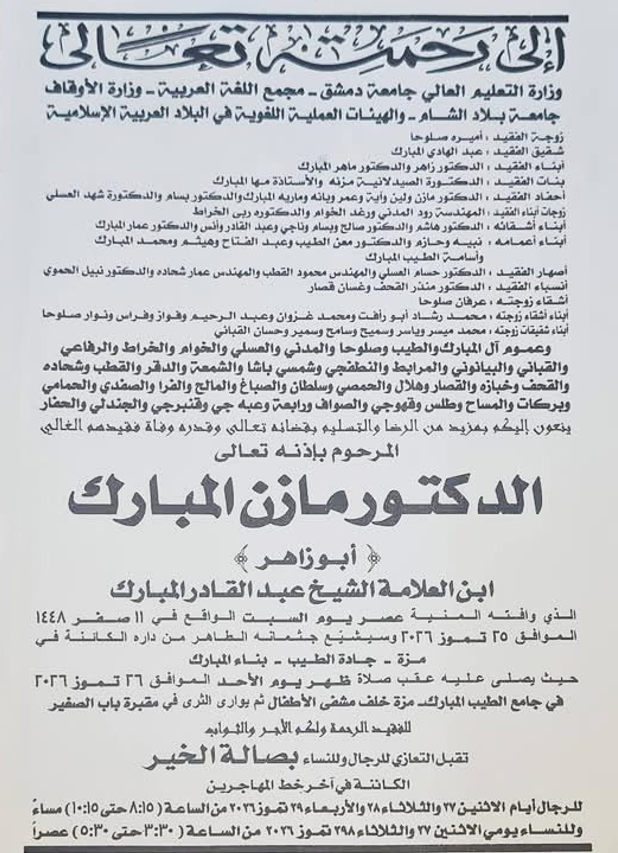
Obituary of Mubārak

Mubārak died in Damascus on afternoon of 25 July 2026, at the age of 95. A memorial service was held for him in the mosque to the prayer, opened by Sheikh Abdul Rahman al-Hammami. The service included a supplication by the Grand Mufti, Sheikh Osama al-Rifai. He was then conveyed to his final resting place and buried in the Bab al-Saghir Cemetery.
