= Mazin Gilbert =

American electrical engineer

Mazin Gilbert is an electrical engineer with Google. He earned his Ph.D. (1991) and BEng (1987) in Electrical and Electronic Engineering from Liverpool University, and an MBA for Executives, from the Wharton Business School (2009).

Gilbert was named a Fellow of the Institute of Electrical and Electronics Engineers (IEEE) (2012) for his contributions to speech recognition, speech synthesis, and spoken language understanding. He specializes in artificial intelligence, software defined networking, digital transformation, cloud technologies, software platforms, and big data.
