= Mazin (surname) =

Mazin is a surname.

It can be of Slavic origin (Russian: Мазин) where its masculine form is Mazin and the feminine counterpart is Mazina.

Notable people with the name include:

- Alexander Mazin (born 1959), Russian writer, poet and songwriter
- Antoine Mazin (1679–1740), French architect and engineer
- Jean-Michel Mazin (born 1950), French paleontologist
- Craig Mazin (born 1971), American screenwriter and film director
- Maria Mazina (born 1964), Russian Olympic champion épée fencer
- Viktor Mazin (1954–2022), Kazakh weightlifter
