= Switching circuit theory =

Mathematical study of switched networks

Switching circuit theory is the mathematical study of the properties of networks of idealized switches. Such networks may be strictly combinational logic, in which their output state is only a function of the present state of their inputs; or may also contain sequential elements, where the present state depends on the present state and past states; in that sense, sequential circuits are said to include "memory" of past states. An important class of sequential circuits are state machines. Switching circuit theory is applicable to the design of telephone systems, computers, and similar systems. Switching circuit theory provided the mathematical foundations and tools for digital system design in almost all areas of modern technology.

In an 1886 letter, Charles Sanders Peirce described how logical operations could be carried out by electrical switching circuits. During 1880–1881 he showed that NOR gates alone (or alternatively NAND gates alone) can be used to reproduce the functions of all the other logic gates, but this work remained unpublished until 1933. The first published proof was by Henry M. Sheffer in 1913, so the NAND logical operation is sometimes called Sheffer stroke; the logical NOR is sometimes called Peirce's arrow. Consequently, these gates are sometimes called universal logic gates.

In 1898, Martin Boda described a switching theory for signalling block systems.

Eventually, vacuum tubes replaced relays for logic operations. Lee De Forest's modification, in 1907, of the Fleming valve can be used as a logic gate. Ludwig Wittgenstein introduced a version of the 16-row truth table as proposition 5.101 of Tractatus Logico-Philosophicus (1921). Walther Bothe, inventor of the coincidence circuit, got part of the 1954 Nobel Prize in physics, for the first modern electronic AND gate in 1924. Konrad Zuse designed and built electromechanical logic gates for his computer Z1 (from 1935 to 1938).

The theory was independently established through the works of NEC engineer Akira Nakashima in Japan, Claude Shannon in the United States, and Victor Shestakov in the Soviet Union. The three published a series of papers showing that the two-valued Boolean algebra, can describe the operation of switching circuits. However, Shannon's work has largely overshadowed the other two, and despite some scholars arguing the similarities of Nakashima's work to Shannon's, their approaches and theoretical frameworks were markedly different. Also implausible is that Shestakov's influenced the other two due to the language barriers and the relative obscurity of his work abroad. Furthermore, Shannon and Shestakov defended their theses the same year in 1938, and Shestakov did not publish until 1941.

Ideal switches are considered as having only two exclusive states, for example, open or closed. In some analysis, the state of a switch can be considered to have no influence on the output of the system and is designated as a "don't care" state. In complex networks it is necessary to also account for the finite switching time of physical switches; where two or more different paths in a network may affect the output, these delays may result in a "logic hazard" or "race condition" where the output state changes due to the different propagation times through the network.

== See also ==
- Circuit switching
- Message switching
- Packet switching
- Fast packet switching
- Network switching subsystem
- 5ESS Switching System
- Number One Electronic Switching System
- Boolean circuit
- Boolean differential calculus
- C-element
- Circuit complexity
- Circuit minimization
- Karnaugh map
- Logic design
- Logic gate
- Logic in computer science
- Nonblocking minimal spanning switch
- Programmable logic controller – computer software mimics relay circuits for industrial applications
- Quine–McCluskey algorithm
- Relay – an early kind of logic device
- Switching lemma
- Unate function
