= Algebraic decision diagram =

Symbolic boolean function representation, extension of BDDs

An algebraic decision diagram (ADD) or a multi-terminal binary decision diagram (MTBDD), is a data structure that is used to symbolically represent a Boolean function whose codomain is an arbitrary finite set S. An ADD is an extension of a reduced ordered binary decision diagram, or commonly named binary decision diagram (BDD) in the literature, which terminal nodes are not restricted to the Boolean values 0 (FALSE) and 1 (TRUE). The terminal nodes may take any value from a set of constants S.

== Definition ==
An ADD represents a Boolean function from $\{0,1\}^n$ to a finite set of constants S, or carrier of the algebraic structure. An ADD is a rooted, directed, acyclic graph, which has several nodes, like a BDD. However, an ADD can have more than two terminal nodes which are elements of the set S, unlike a BDD.

An ADD can also be seen as a Boolean function, or a vectorial Boolean function, by extending the codomain of the function, such that $f: \{0,1\}^n \to Q$ with $S \subseteq Q$ and $card(Q) = 2^n$ for some integer n. Therefore, the theorems of the Boolean algebra applies to ADD, notably the Boole's expansion theorem.

Each node of is labeled by a Boolean variable and has two outgoing edges: a 1-edge which represents the evaluation of the variable to the value TRUE, and a 0-edge for its evaluation to FALSE.

An ADD employs the same reduction rules as a BDD (or Reduced Ordered BDD):

- merge any isomorphic subgraphs, and
- eliminate any node whose two children are isomorphic.

ADDs are canonical according to a particular variable ordering.

== Matrix partitioning ==
An ADD can be represented by a matrix according to its cofactors. For example, consider a function $f(x,y)$ over Boolean variables $x$ and $y$, taking values in $\{0,1,2,3\}$, defined by: $f(0,0)=1,\quad f(0,1)=2,\quad f(1,0)=3,\quad f(1,1)=0.$

This function can be represented as the matrix
$$M =
\begin{bmatrix}
1 & 2 \\
3 & 0
\end{bmatrix},$$
where rows correspond to $x \in \{0,1\}$ and columns correspond to $y \in \{0,1\}$.

In the ADD representation, the root node is labeled by $x$, and its outgoing edges correspond to the cofactors $f_{x=0}(y)$ and $f_{x=1}(y)$, commonly referred to as the low (0) edge and high (1) edge, respectively, represented by the first and second rows of the matrix. Each cofactor is further decomposed with respect to $y$, yielding terminal nodes corresponding to the matrix entries. Thus, the Shannon decomposition used in ADDs corresponds to recursively partitioning the matrix into submatrices.

== Applications ==
ADDs were first implemented for sparse matrix multiplication and shortest path algorithms (Bellman-Ford, Repeated Squaring, and Floyd-Warshall procedures).

== See also ==
- Binary decision diagram
- Zero-suppressed decision diagram
