= Aanderaa =

Aanderaa is a Norwegian surname. Notable people with the surname include:

- Johannes Aanderaa (1927–1991), Norwegian librarian, theatre critic, publisher and civil servant
- Jorunn Aanderaa (1934–2025), Norwegian poet
- Stål Aanderaa (1931–2026), Norwegian mathematician
  - Aanderaa–Karp–Rosenberg conjecture
