= Heys =

Heys may refer to:

- Prestwich Heys A.F.C., an English amateur football club
- Prior's Heys, an English civil parish

== People with the surname ==
- Howard Heys, English cryptographer
- Stephen Heys, English footballer
