= Signority =

Canadian electronic signature provider

Signority Inc.
- Industry: Software as a Service
- Founded: November 19, 2010
- Headquarters: 1000 Innovation Centre; Kanata, Ontario; K2K 3E7
- Products: Electronic signatures
- Website: signority.com

Signority is a cloud-based electronic signature provider based in Ottawa, Ontario, Canada that provides web-based public and private cloud electronic signature solutions. The company was co-founded in 2010 by Jane He and Qingbo Jin.

== History ==
Signority has its headquarters in Ottawa, Ontario, Canada. It was incorporated as a federal and a provincial (Ontario) corporation on November 19, 2010 by two Canadian entrepreneurs: Jane He and Qingbo Jin. At inception, the company name was EPEink (Electronic Pen/Paper Electronic Ink) and the product name was GreenSignatures. In January 2013, the company and the product were re-branded to Signority.

In May 2024 Signority was acquired by FileCloud, a content collaboration platform. FileCloud is a content collaboration platform (CCP) that offers compliance, data governance, data leak protection, data retention, and digital rights management capabilities.

== Patents and product ==
Signority has had two applications filed to United States Patent and Trademark Office:

1. A patent application is a break through in the incorporation complicated digital signature technology, or PKI Public Key Infrastructure into a SaaS offering. PKI is highly secure, and is recognized by global legislative bodies. Conversely, the legal weight of electronic signatures is a matter for debate in many regions outside of North America, and within specific sectors within North America, such as banks and medical institutions. PKI usually requires on-premises software (can be combined with hardware devices) that must be installed at both servers and the clients that utilize PKI. It ensures document signing nonrepudiation and document integrity within an organization, but is not practical when recipients are outside the organization, such as when recipients are external to the organization hosting the PKI servers. Signority invented a method to bring PKI into its SaaS offering, by never generating and storing private keys on its servers. The private key is generated on the fly at the user end each time. The method was invented by University of Ottawa Professors Carlisle Adams, who previously designed CAST algorithm, and Guy-Vincent Jourdan.
2. A patent application for two signing methods: Real-Time Sign, which incorporates electronic evidence (audio and video) during the signing process to meet global legislation, and Open Sign: a time saver for document administrators that enables large volume public recipients signing template-based forms. The inventors are founders Jane He and Qingbo Jin.

== See also ==
- Electronic signature
- Public key infrastructure
