= List of adverse effects of valproate =

List of adverse effects of valproate by frequency:

== Very common (>10%) ==
- Nausea
- Vomiting
- Diarrhea
- Headache
- Low platelet count (dose-related)
- Tremor (dose-related)
- Alopecia (hair loss, usually temporary)
- Drowsiness
- Dizziness
- Hyperandrogenism in females
- Seeing double
- Indigestion
- Lazy eye
- Infection
- Tinnitus
- Elevated aminotransferase concentrations (dose-related; indicative of liver injury)

== Common (1-10%) ==
* Paresthesia
- Abdominal pain
- Tremor
- Increased appetite
- Weight gain
- Ataxia
- Polycystic ovaries
- Memory impairment
- Menstrual irregularities
- Rash
- Back pain
- Mood changes
- Anxiety
- Confusion
- Abnormal gait
- Hallucinations
- Catatonia
- Dysarthria
- Tardive dyskinesia
- Vertigo
- High blood levels of ammonia without symptoms

== Uncommon (0.1-1%) ==
- Peripheral edema
- Syndrome of inappropriate secretion of antidiuretic hormone (SIAH)

== Rare (<0.1% frequency) ==
* Liver failure
- Pancreatitis (these two usually occur in first 6 months and can be fatal)
- Leukopenia (low white blood cell count)
- Neutropenia (low neutrophil count)
- Pure red cell aplasia
- Agranulocytosis
- Extrapyramidal syndrome (including parkinsonism, may be reversible)
- Brain problems due to high ammonia levels
- Drug-induced hypothermia (low body temperature)
- Hypersensitivity reactions including multi-organ hypersensitivity syndrome
- Eosinophilic pleural effusion
- Bone fractures (reduced BMD with long-term use)
