= BMD =

BMD may refer to:

== Organisations ==
- Bangladesh Meteorological Department
- BMD Group, an Australian civil engineering company
- Botswana Movement for Democracy, a minor right-wing populist opposition party in Botswana
- Civil registration or General Register Office (from Births, Marriages and Deaths)
- FreeBMD, a website for searching births, deaths and marriages records
- Blackmagic Design, an Australian digital cinema company

== Military ==
- Ballistic Missile Defense
- Boyevaya Mashina Desanta (Russian: Боевая Машина Десанта, literally 'Combat Vehicle of the Airborne'), a series of Soviet/Russian airborne infantry fighting vehicles
  - BMD-1
  - BMD-2
  - BMD-3
  - BMD-4

== Medicine ==
- Bacitracin methylene disalicylate, an antibiotic growth promoter
- Becker muscular dystrophy, a genetic muscle disorder
- Berkeley Mortality Database, a precursor to the Human Mortality Database
- Bone mineral density, the amount of bone mineral in bone tissue
- Broth microdilution, an antimicrobial resistance test
- Borellia miyamotoi disease, a disease caused by bacterium Borrelia miyamotoi
- Bipolar Mood Disorder (Bipolar disorder), a disorder of depression and mood episodes

== Other ==
- Ballot marking device, a type of voting machine
- Bermudian dollar by ISO 4217 code
- Bending moment diagram, a type of shear and moment diagram used in mechanical engineering
- Bernese Mountain Dog, a Swiss breed of dog
- Brimsdown railway station, London (National Rail station code BMD)
- Bruce Mau Design
- Binary moment diagram

== See also ==
- BDM (disambiguation)
