= Howard Heys =

Cryptographer

Howard M. Heys is a cryptographer, a retired professor of Electrical and Computer Engineering at Memorial University of Newfoundland. His research includes the design and analysis of stream and block ciphers and efficient hardware implementations of them; he participated in the design of CAST-256 and has published cryptanalyses of such block ciphers as RC5 and CIKS-1. He has served twice as co-chair of the Selected Areas in Cryptography workshop: with Carlisle Adams in 1999, and with Kaisa Nyberg in 2002.

Heys received his Ph.D. in 1994 from Queen's University. He lives in St. John's, Newfoundland with his wife and two children.
