= Boole's expansion theorem =

Theorem in Boolean algebra

Boole's expansion theorem, often referred to as the Shannon expansion or Shannon decomposition, is the identity $F = x \cdot F_x + x' \cdot F_{x'}$, where $F$ is any Boolean function, $x$ is a variable, $x'$ is the complement of $x$, and $F_x$and $F_{x'}$ are $F$ with the argument $x$ set equal to $1$ and to $0$ respectively.

The terms $F_x$ and $F_{x'}$ are sometimes called the positive and negative Shannon cofactors, respectively, of $F$ with respect to $x$. These are functions, computed by the $\operatorname{restrict}$ operator, $\operatorname{restrict}(F, x, 0)$ and $\operatorname{restrict}(F, x, 1)$.

The theorem has been called the "fundamental theorem of Boolean algebra". Besides its theoretical importance, it paved the way for binary decision diagrams (BDDs), satisfiability solvers, and many other techniques relevant to computer engineering and formal verification of digital circuits. In such contexts, particularly in BDDs, the expansion is interpreted as an if-then-else, with the variable $x$ being the condition and the cofactors being the branches ($F_x$ when $x$ is true and respectively $F_{x'}$ when $x$ is false).

== Statement of the theorem ==
A more explicit way of stating the theorem is:

$$f(X_1, X_2, \dots , X_n) = X_1 \cdot f(1, X_2, \dots , X_n) + X_1' \cdot f(0, X_2, \dots , X_n)$$

== Variations and implications ==
XOR-Form
The statement also holds when the disjunction "+" is replaced by the XOR operator:
$$f(X_1, X_2, \dots , X_n) = X_1 \cdot f(1, X_2, \dots , X_n) \oplus X_1' \cdot f(0, X_2, \dots , X_n)$$
Dual form
There is a dual form of the Shannon expansion (which does not have a related XOR form):
$$f(X_1, X_2, \dots , X_n) = (X_1 + f(0, X_2, \dots , X_n)) \cdot (X_1' + f(1, X_2, \dots , X_n))$$

Repeated application for each argument leads to the Sum of Products (SoP) canonical form of the Boolean function $f$. For example, for $n=2$ that would be

$$\begin{align}
f(X_1, X_2) & = X_1 \cdot f(1, X_2) + X_1' \cdot f(0, X_2)\\
& = X_1 X_2 \cdot f(1, 1) + X_1 X_2' \cdot f(1, 0) + X_1' X_2 \cdot f(0, 1) + X_1' X_2' \cdot f(0, 0)
\end{align}$$

Likewise, application of the dual form leads to the Product of Sums (PoS) canonical form (using the distributivity law of $+$ over $\cdot$):

$$\begin{align}
f(X_1, X_2) & = (X_1 + f(0, X_2)) \cdot (X_1' + f(1, X_2))\\
& = (X_1 + X_2 + f(0, 0)) \cdot (X_1 + X_2' + f(0, 1)) \cdot (X_1' + X_2 + f(1, 0)) \cdot (X_1' + X_2' + f(1, 1))
\end{align}$$

== Properties of cofactors ==
Linear properties of cofactors:
For a Boolean function F which is made up of two Boolean functions G and H the following are true:
If $F = H'$ then $F_x = H'_x$
If $F = G \cdot H$ then $F_x = G_x \cdot H_x$
If $F = G + H$ then $F_x = G_x + H_x$
If $F = G \oplus H$ then $F_x = G_x \oplus H_x$
Characteristics of unate functions:
If F is a unate function and...
If F is positive unate then $F = x \cdot F_x + F_{x'}$
If F is negative unate then $F = F_x + x' \cdot F_{x'}$

== Operations with cofactors ==
Boolean difference:
The Boolean difference or Boolean derivative of the function F with respect to the literal x is defined as:
$$\frac{\partial F}{\partial x} = F_x \oplus F_{x'}$$
Universal quantification:
The universal quantification of F is defined as:
$$\forall x F = F_x \cdot F_{x'}$$
Existential quantification:
The existential quantification of F is defined as:
$$\exists x F = F_x + F_{x'}$$

== History ==
George Boole presented this expansion as his Proposition II, "To expand or develop a function involving any number of logical symbols", in his Laws of Thought (1854), and it was "widely applied by Boole and other nineteenth-century logicians".

Claude Shannon mentioned this expansion, among other Boolean identities, in a 1949 paper, and showed the switching network interpretations of the identity. In the literature of computer design and switching theory, the identity is often incorrectly attributed to Shannon.

== Application to switching circuits ==
1. Binary decision diagrams follow from systematic use of this theorem
2. Any Boolean function can be implemented directly in a switching circuit using a hierarchy of basic multiplexer by repeated application of this theorem.

== See also ==
- Reed–Muller expansion
