= Selected Areas in Cryptography =

Cryptography conference in Canada

Selected Areas in Cryptography (SAC) is an international cryptography conference (originally a workshop) held every August in Canada since 1994. The first workshop was organized by Carlisle Adams, Henk Meijer, Stafford Tavares and Paul van Oorschot. Through 1999, SAC was hosted at either Queen's University or Carleton University, but starting in 2000, locations have ranged across Canada. SAC has featured research presentations on many cryptographic topics, with a traditional focus on the design and analysis of block ciphers. SAC is regarded as a high-quality venue for presenting cryptographic results, and is the only cryptography conference held annually in Canada. Since 2003, SAC has included an invited lecture called the Stafford Tavares Lecture, in honor of one of its original organizers and strongest supporters.

Each year, SAC features four topics:

1. Design and analysis of symmetric key primitives and cryptosystems including block and stream ciphers, hash functions, MAC algorithms, and authenticated encryption schemes.
2. Efficient implementations of symmetric and public key algorithms.
3. Mathematical and algorithmic aspects of applied cryptology.
4. A special topic selected by the current co-chairs that may vary from year to year.

The "SAC" acronym is also a tongue-in-cheek reference to the strict avalanche criterion, a cryptographic property defined in terms of Boolean functions.
