= Unate function =

Boolean function which has monotonic properties

A unate function is a type of boolean function which has monotonic properties. They have been studied extensively in switching theory.

A function $f(x_1,x_2,\ldots,x_n)$ is said to be positive unate in $x_i$ if for all possible values of $x_j$, $j\neq i$

$$f(x_1,x_2,\ldots,x_{i-1},1,x_{i+1},\ldots,x_n) \ge f(x_1,x_2,\ldots,x_{i-1},0,x_{i+1},\ldots,x_n).\,$$

Likewise, it is negative unate in $x_i$ if

$$f(x_1,x_2,\ldots,x_{i-1},0,x_{i+1},\ldots,x_n) \ge f(x_1,x_2,\ldots,x_{i-1},1,x_{i+1},\ldots,x_n).\,$$

If for every $x_i$ f is either positive or negative unate in the variable $x_i$ then it is said to be unate (note that some $x_i$ may be positive unate and some negative unate to satisfy the definition of unate function). A function is binate if it is not unate (i.e., is neither positive unate nor negative unate in at least one of its variables).

For example, the logical disjunction function or with boolean values used for true (1) and false (0) is positive unate. Conversely, Exclusive or is non-unate, because the transition from 0 to 1 on input x0 is both positive unate and negative unate, depending on the input value on x1.
