= Stephen Heys =

English footballer

Personal information
- Date of birth: 1879
- Place of birth: Accrington, England
- Position: Defender

Senior career*
| Years | Team | Apps | (Gls) |
| 19xx–1906 | Colne | | |
| 1906–1909 | Burnley | 1 | (0) |
| 1909–19xx | Haslingden | ? | (?) |
- * Club domestic league appearances and goals

Stephen Heys (1879 – after 1909) was an English professional footballer who played as a defender. Born in Accrington, Lancashire, he played non-league football with Colne before joining Football League Second Division side Burnley in May 1906. He made his Football League debut on 12 October 1907 in the 0–1 loss to Fulham at Turf Moor. Heys failed to make another first-team appearance for Burnley and transferred to Haslingden in May 1909.
