= BDM =

BDM may refer to:

== Arts and entertainment ==
- Berkeley Dance Marathon, an annual benefit for the Elizabeth Glaser Pediatric AIDS Foundation hosted at University of California, Berkeley
- Big Damn Movie, referring to the movie Serenity by Joss Whedon
- Black Desert Mobile

=== Music ===
- The Black Dahlia Murder (band), an American extreme metal band from Michigan
- Brutal death metal, a subgenre of death metal music
- Blackened death metal, a subgenre of black metal music

== Government and politics ==
- Civil registration of births, deaths and marriages in the UK and many Commonwealth countries, with records usually held by the General Register Office
- Bund Deutscher Mädel (League of German Girls), a girls' organisation in Nazi Germany

== Business ==
- Braddock Dunn & McDonald, an American defense contractor; now part of Northrop Grumman
- Business decision mapping, a technique for making decisions of the kind that often need to be made in business
- Business development manager, a job-title for commercial employees that aim to increase company size, revenue, and profits by leveraging business intelligence, technology, partnerships, sales, and marketing.
- BDM (aircraft constructor), a French aircraft constructor/designer; see List of aircraft (B–Be)

== People ==
- Brian David-Marshall, a writer about Magic: The Gathering
- Bruce Bueno de Mesquita, noted political scientist at New York University

== Science, medicine and technology ==
- Background debug mode interface, a programming interface to embedded systems microcontrollers like JTAG
- 2,3-Butanedione monoxime, an organic compound also known as diacetyl monoxime
- Browning BDM, the "Browning Dual Mode" automatic pistol made by Browning
- M141 Bunker Defeat Munition, a modern weapon
- Bateson–Dobzhansky–Muller model, a model of evolutionary speciation
- Becker-DeGroot-Marschak method, a method of measuring willingness-to-pay in experimental economics
- Biodiversity Monitoring Switzerland

== Transport ==
- Bedford railway station, Bedfordshire, England, National Rail station code BDM

== Other ==
- IOC sport code for badminton at the Summer Olympics
