= Carlisle Adams =

Canadian cryptographer

Carlisle M. Adams
- Citizenship: Canadian
- Education: University of Guelph (B.Sc.); Queen's University (M.Sc, PhD)
- Scientific career
- Fields: Cryptology, Computer security
- Workplaces: University of Ottawa

Carlisle M. Adams is a Canadian cryptographer and computer security researcher. Formerly senior cryptographer at Entrust, he is currently a professor at the University of Ottawa. His notable work includes the design (with Stafford Tavares) of the block ciphers CAST-128 and CAST-256, whose S-boxes are based on the non-linear properties of bent functions. He also helped organize the first Selected Areas in Cryptography (SAC) workshop in 1994. He is also the security advisor of the Ottawa-based electronic signature company Signority.

== Publications ==
=== Request For Comments ===
Adams is the (co)author of the following RFCs:

- RFC 2025 – "The Simple Public-Key GSS-API Mechanism (SPKM)," Proposed Standard.
- RFC 2144 – "The CAST-128 Encryption Algorithm," Informational.
- RFC 2479 – "Independent Data Unit Protection Generic Security Service Application Program Interface (IDUP-GSS-API)," Informational.
- RFC 2510 – "Internet X.509 Public Key Infrastructure Certificate Management Protocols," Obsolete. Obsoleted by RFC 4210.
- RFC 2511 – "Internet X.509 Certificate Request Message Format," Obsolete.
- RFC 2560 – "X.509 Internet Public Key Infrastructure Online Certificate Status Protocol - OCSP," Obsolete. Obsoleted by RFC 6960. Updated by RFC 6277.
- RFC 2612 – "The CAST-256 Encryption Algorithm," Informational.
- RFC 2984 – "Use of the CAST-128 Encryption Algorithm in CMS," Proposed Standard.
- RFC 3029 – "Internet X.509 Public Key Infrastructure Data Validation and Certification Server Protocols," Experimental.
- RFC 3161 – "Internet X.509 Public Key Infrastructure Time-Stamp Protocol (TSP)," Proposed Standard.
- RFC 4210 – "Internet X.509 Public Key Infrastructure Certificate Management Protocol (CMP)," Proposed Standard.
- RFC 4212 – "Alternative Certificate Formats for the Public-Key Infrastructure Using X.509 (PKIX) Certificate Management Protocols," Informational.
- RFC 6960 – "X.509 Internet Public Key Infrastructure Online Certificate Status Protocol - OCSP," Proposed Standard.
