= Correlation immunity =

In mathematics, the correlation immunity of a Boolean function is a measure of the degree to which its outputs are uncorrelated with some subset of its inputs. Specifically, a Boolean function is said to be correlation-immune of order m if every subset of m or fewer variables in $x_1,x_2,\ldots,x_n$ is statistically independent of the value of $f(x_1,x_2,\ldots,x_n)$.

== Definition ==
A function $f:\mathbb{F}_2^n\rightarrow\mathbb{F}_2$ is $k$-th order correlation immune if for any independent $n$ binary random variables $X_0\ldots X_{n-1}$, the random variable $Z=f(X_0,\ldots,X_{n-1})$ is independent from any random vector $(X_{i_1}\ldots X_{i_k})$ with $0\leq i_1<\ldots<i_k<n$.

== Results in cryptography ==
When used in a stream cipher as a combining function for linear feedback shift registers, a Boolean function with low-order correlation-immunity is more susceptible to a correlation attack than a function with correlation immunity of high order.

Siegenthaler showed that the correlation immunity m of a Boolean function of algebraic degree d of n variables satisfies m + d ≤ n; for a given set of input variables, this means that a high algebraic degree will restrict the maximum possible correlation immunity. Furthermore, if the function is balanced then m + d ≤ n − 1.
