= Johannes Aanderaa =

Norwegian theatre critic and civil servant (1927–1991)

- Born: 6 November 1927; Narvik, Norway
- Died: 2 June 1991 (aged 63)
- Occupations: publisher and civil servant
- Relatives: Bjarne Andersen (brother-in-law)

Johannes Aanderaa (6 November 1927 – 2 June 1991) was a Norwegian librarian, theatre critic, publisher and civil servant. He was a theatre critic for the magazine Syn og Segn. He worked for the Norwegian Broadcasting Corporation from 1954 to 1958. He chaired the publishing house Det Norske Samlaget from 1958 to 1972. He was a civil servant in the Ministry of Church and Education from 1972, later Ministry of Cultural and Scientific Affairs, and a central person in the shaping of Norwegian cultural and educational policy.
