= Stafford Tavares =

Canadian cryptographer

- Occupation: Cryptographer
- Known for: Studying design and analysis of block ciphers

Stafford Emanuel Tavares is a Canadian cryptographer, professor emeritus at Queen's University. His notable work includes the design (with Carlisle Adams) of the block ciphers CAST-128 and CAST-256. He also helped organize the first Selected Areas in Cryptography (SAC) workshop in 1994. Since 2003, SAC has included an invited lecture in his honor, the Stafford Tavares Lecture.

Tavares received his Ph.D. in 1968 from McGill University.

In 2018 he was elected as a fellow of the International Association for Cryptologic Research, "for significant contributions to the design and analysis of block ciphers, for founding the SAC conference, and for service to the IACR".
