= Stål Aanderaa =

Norwegian mathematician

- Born: February 1, 1931; Beitstad
- Died: January 24, 2026; Oslo
- Occupation: Mathematician
- Years active: 1959–2026

Stål Aanderaa (1 February 1931 – 24 January 2026) was a Norwegian mathematician.

== Biography ==
Aanderaa was born in Beitstad. He completed the mag.scient. degree in 1959 and his doctorate at Harvard University in 1966. He was a professor at the University of Oslo from 1978 to his retirement in 2001.

Aanderaa was a member of the Norwegian Academy of Science and Letters.

== Work ==
Aanderaa is one of the namesakes of the Aanderaa–Karp–Rosenberg conjecture.
