= CAST-256 =

Block cipher

General
- Designers: Carlisle Adams, Stafford Tavares, Howard Heys, Michael Wiener
- First published: 1998
- Derived from: CAST-128

Cipher detail
- Key sizes: 128, 160, 192, 224, or 256 bits
- Block sizes: 128 bits
- Structure: generalised Feistel network (Type 1)
- Rounds: 48

In cryptography, CAST-256 (or CAST6) is a symmetric-key block cipher published in June 1998. It was submitted as a candidate for the Advanced Encryption Standard (AES); however, it was not among the five AES finalists. It is an extension of an earlier cipher, CAST-128; both were designed according to the "CAST" design methodology invented by Carlisle Adams and Stafford Tavares. Howard Heys and Michael Wiener also contributed to the design.

CAST-256 uses the same elements as CAST-128, including S-boxes, but is adapted for a block size of 128 bits – twice the size of its 64-bit predecessor. (A similar construction occurred in the evolution of RC5 into RC6). Acceptable key sizes are 128, 160, 192, 224 or 256 bits. CAST-256 is composed of 48 rounds, sometimes described as 12 "quad-rounds", arranged in a generalized Feistel network.

In RFC 2612, the authors state that, "The CAST-256 cipher described in this document is available worldwide on a royalty-free and licence-free basis for commercial and non-commercial uses."

Currently, the best public cryptanalysis of CAST-256 in the standard single secret key setting that works for all keys is the zero-correlation cryptanalysis breaking 28 rounds with 2^{246.9} time and 2^{98.8} data.

== See also ==
- AES process
