= Platon Poretsky =

- Платон Серге́евич Порецкий
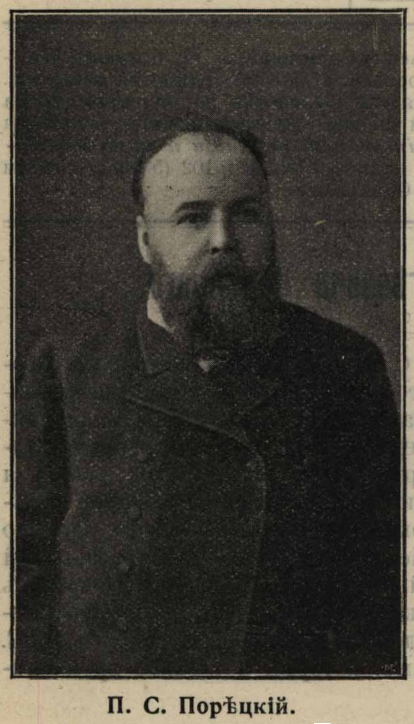
- Born: 3 October 1846; Elisavetgrad, Russian Empire
- Died: 9 August 1907 (aged 60); Gorodnyansky Uyezd, Chernigov Governorate, Russian Empire
- Education: Kharkov University
- Known for: Poretsky's law of forms
- Scientific career
- Fields: Astronomy, mathematics, logic
- Workplaces: Kazan University
- Thesis: On the solution of some of the normal systems occurring in spherical astronomy, with an application to identify errors in the division of the Kazan Observatory meridian circle (1886)

Platon Sergeevich Poretsky (Russian: Платон Серге́евич Порецкий; 3 October 1846 in Elisavetgrad, Russian Empire – 9 August 1907 in Gorodnyansky Uyezd, Chernigov Governorate, Russian Empire) was a noted Russian Imperial astronomer, mathematician, and logician.

Graduated from Kharkov University, he worked in Astrakhan and Pulkovo in St. Petersburg.

Later, as an astronomer at Kazan University, following the advice of his older colleague Professor of Mathematics A. V. Vasiliev at Kazan University (father of Nicolai A. Vasiliev) to learn the works of George Boole, Poretsky developed "logical calculus" and through specific "logical equations" applied it to the theory of probability. Thus, he extended and augmented the works of logicians and mathematicians George Boole, William Stanley Jevons and Ernst Schröder (known as Boole–Jevons–Schröder–Poretsky method). He discovered Poretsky's law of forms and gave the first general treatment of antecedent and consequent Boolean reasoning, laying the groundwork for Archie Blake's work on the Blake canonical form.
