= Dobrianka =

Rural locality in Chernihiv Oblast, Ukraine

Dobrianka Добрянка
- Rural settlement
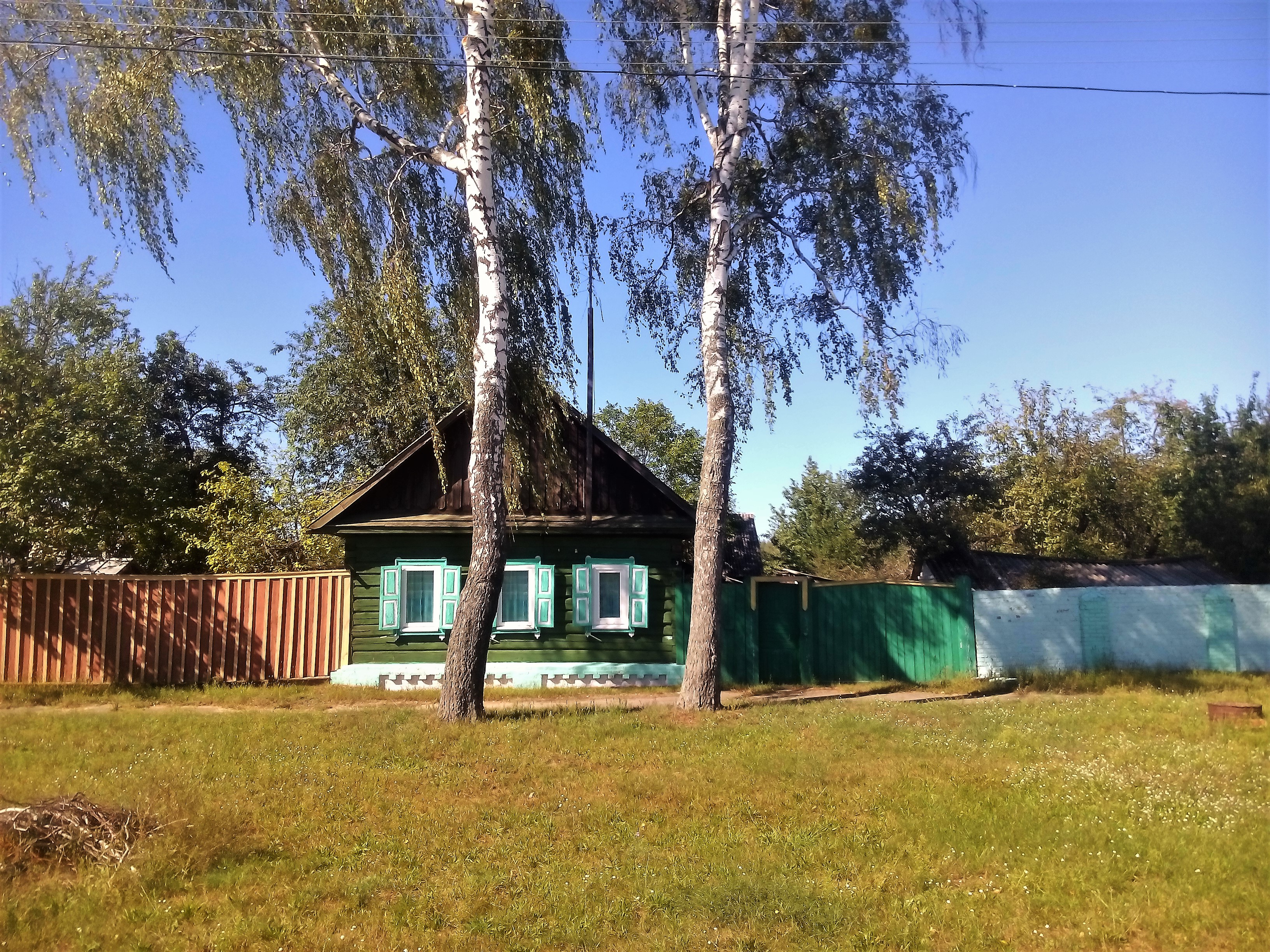
- A house in Dobrianka
- Interactive map of Dobrianka
- Location within Chernihiv Oblast Location within Ukraine
- Coordinates: 52°03′45″N 31°10′57″E
- Country: Ukraine
- Oblast: Chernihiv Oblast
- Raion: Chernihiv Raion

Population (2024)
  - Total: 2,355
- Time zone: UTC+2 (EET)
  - Summer (DST): UTC+3 (EEST)

Dobrianka (Ukrainian: Добрянка; Russian: Добрянка) is a rural settlement in Chernihiv Raion, Chernihiv Oblast, northern Ukraine. It hosts the administration of Dobrianka settlement hromada, one of the hromadas of Ukraine. Population: 2,607 (2022 estimate).

Dobrianka is located on the left bank of the Nemylnia which makes the state border between Ukraine and Belarus.

== History ==
In the 19th century the settlement was part of Yarylovichskaya volost, Gorodnyansky Uyezd, Chernigov Governorate of the Russian Empire.

Urban-type settlement since 1924.

During World War II it was occupied by Axis troops from August 12, 1941 until September 29, 1943.

In 1971, there was a furniture factory, a clothing factory, a vegetable drying plant, and a peat-producing enterprise.

In January 1989, the population was 4042.

Until 18 July 2020, Dobrianka belonged to Ripky Raion. The raion was abolished in July 2020 as part of the administrative reform of Ukraine, which reduced the number of raions of Chernihiv Oblast to five. The area of Ripky Raion was merged into Chernihiv Raion.

Until 26 January 2024, Dobrianka was designated urban-type settlement. On this day, a new law entered into force which abolished this status, and Dobrianka became a rural settlement.

== Transportation ==
А railway station, on the Southwestern Railways connecting Chernihiv and Gomel, is located in Dobrianka. This is the closest station to the border from the Ukrainian side.

Dobrianka has access to Highway M01 which connects Kyiv via Chernihiv to the state border and continues to Gomel behind the border.

== Economy ==
Traditional occupations in Dobrianka are peat production and tailoring.
