= Poretsky's law of forms =

Theorem in Boolean algebra

In Boolean algebra, Poretsky's law of forms shows that the single Boolean equation $f(X)=0$ is equivalent to $g(X)=h(X)$ if and only if $g=f\oplus h$, where $\oplus$ represents exclusive or.

The law of forms was discovered by Platon Poretsky.

== See also ==
- Archie Blake (mathematician)
- Blake–Poretsky law
