= Blake canonical form =

Standard form of Boolean function

Karnaugh map of A̅B + B̅C̅ + A̅C̅, a sum of all prime implicants (each rendered in a different color). Deleting A̅C̅ results in a minimal sum.

A̅B̅D̅ + A̅BC + ABD + AB̅C̅

A̅CD̅ + BCD + AC̅D + B̅C̅D̅

Boolean function with two different minimal forms. The Blake canonical form is the sum of the two.

In Boolean logic, a formula for a Boolean function f is in Blake canonical form (BCF), also called the complete sum of prime implicants, the complete sum, or the disjunctive prime form, when it is a disjunction of all the prime implicants of f.

== Relation to other forms ==
The Blake canonical form is a special case of disjunctive normal form.

The Blake canonical form is not necessarily minimal (upper diagram), however all the terms of a minimal sum are contained in the Blake canonical form. On the other hand, the Blake canonical form is a canonical form, that is, it is unique up to reordering, whereas there can be multiple minimal forms (lower diagram). Selecting a minimal sum from a Blake canonical form amounts in general to solving the set cover problem, so is NP-hard.

== History ==
Archie Blake presented his canonical form at a meeting of the American Mathematical Society in 1932, and in his 1937 dissertation. He called it the "simplified canonical form"; it was named the "Blake canonical form" by Frank Markham Brown and Sergiu Rudeanu in 1986–1990. Together with Platon Poretsky's work it is also referred to as "Blake–Poretsky laws".

== Methods for calculation ==
Blake discussed three methods for calculating the canonical form: exhaustion of implicants, iterated consensus, and multiplication. The iterated consensus method was rediscovered by Edward W. Samson and Burton E. Mills, Willard Quine, and Kurt Bing. In 2022, Milan Mossé, Harry Sha, and Li-Yang Tan discovered a near-optimal algorithm for computing the Blake canonical form of a formula in conjunctive normal form.

== See also ==
- Poretsky law
- Horn clause
- Quine–McCluskey algorithm
