= Glitch (disambiguation) =

A glitch is a short-lived fault in a system.

Glitch may also refer to:

== Arts, entertainment, and media ==
=== Fictional entities ===
- Glitch (character), a character in Tin Man
- Glitch, an electronic monster character in Garfield: Caught in the Act
- Glitch, a character in Dance Central 2 and Dance Central 3
- Glitch, the protagonist in Metal Arms: Glitch in the System
- Glitch, Bob's keytool in ReBoot

=== Films ===
- Glitch!, a 1988 film by Nico Mastorakis
- The Glitch (2008), a short film

=== Gaming ===
- Glitch (video game), a 2011 defunct online multiplayer game
- Glitching (video games), an activity involving finding and exploiting flaws or glitches in video games

=== Music ===
- Glitch (music), a genre of electronic music that emerged in the late 1990s
- Glitch (album), a 2013 album by V V Brown

==== Songs ====
- "Glitch", a 1993 song by OLD from The Musical Dimensions of Sleastak
- "Glitch", a 1996 song by Blind Melon from Nico
- "Glitch", a 2017 song by Chon from Homey
- "Glitch", a 2019 song by Martin Garrix and Julian Jordan from The Martin Garrix Experience
- "Glitch", a 2022 song by Parkway Drive from Darker Still
- "Glitch", a 2022 song by Taylor Swift on the extended version of Midnights
- "Glitch", a 2022 song by Kwon Eun-bi on the EP Color
- "Glitch", a 2025 song by Jade from That's Showbiz Baby!
- "Glitches", a 2003 song by V Shape Mind from Cul-De-Sac
- "Glitches", a 2016 song by Every Time I Die from Low Teens

=== Television ===
- "Glitch" (The Outer Limits), a 2000 episode of The Outer Limits
- Glitch (Australian TV series), a 2015 Australian television drama series
- Glitch (South Korean TV series), a 2022 television series
- "The Glitch", a season 12 episode of Midsomer Murders
- "The Glitch", an episode of Ninjago: Prime Empire

=== Other arts, entertainment, and media ===
- Glitch art, a type of art that uses digital or analog errors (glitches) for aesthetic purpose
- GLitcH!, a comic strip by Ed Wiens

== Companies ==
- Glitch Productions, an Australian animation studio
- Glitch, Inc., a former software company, or the web development software of the same name
- Glitch (Minnesota company), software and video game development company based in Minneapolis

== Other uses ==
- Glitch (astronomy), a sudden increase in the rotational frequency of a rotation-powered pulsar
