= Glitch =

Brief fault in a computer system

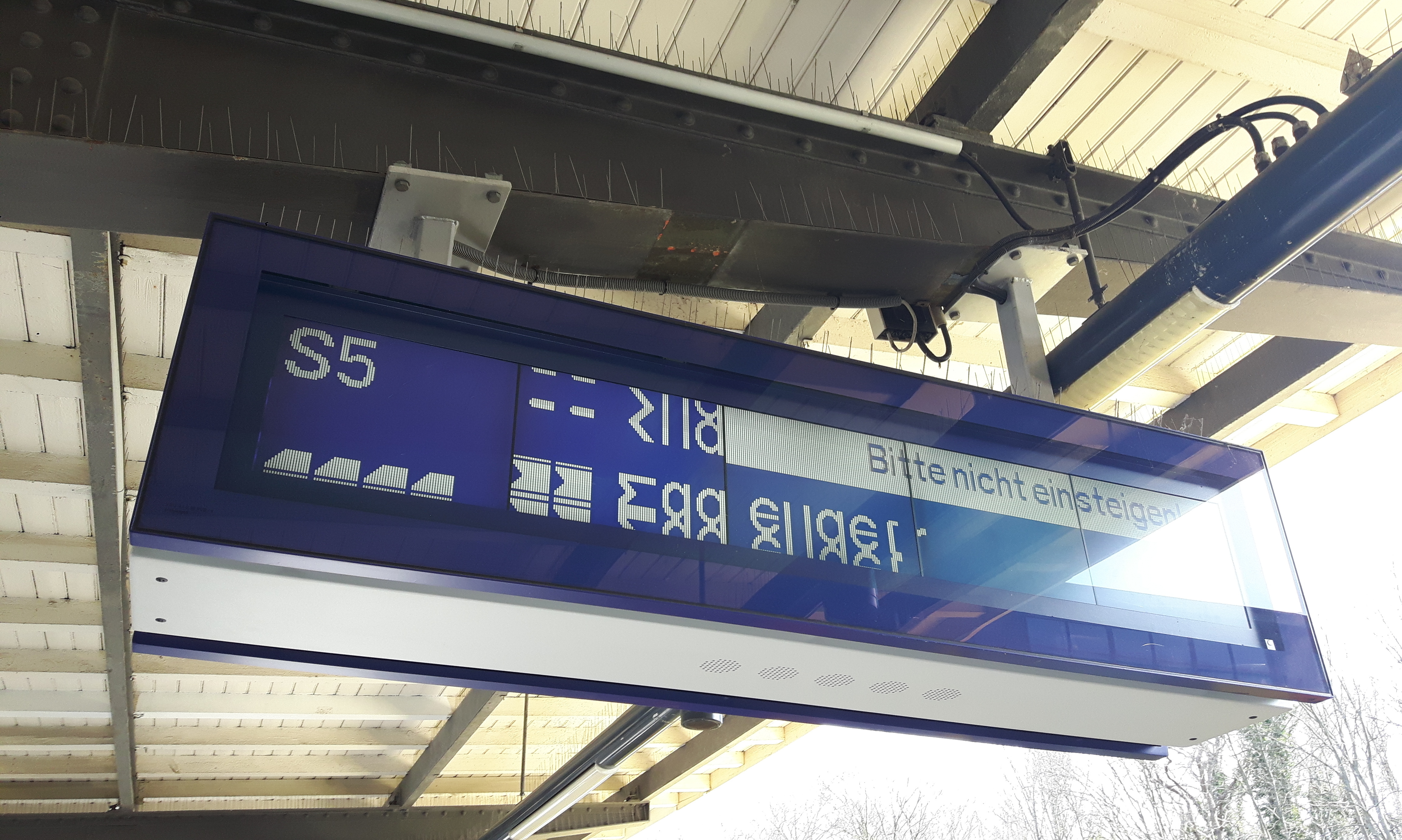
A railway station display affected by a visual glitch, corrupting some of the text

A glitch is a brief technical fault, such as a transient one that corrects itself, making it difficult to troubleshoot. The term is particularly common in the computing and electronics industries, in circuit bending, as well as among players of video games, although any purposely organized structure, such as speech, may experience glitches.

A glitch, which is subtle and often temporary, differs from a more serious bug, which is a genuine breakdown in function. Videogame writer Alex Pieschel says that although the two words are often used interchangeably when describing software, the more "blameworthy pejorative" of bug indicates something that can be reliably diagnosed and corrected, while glitch describes a situation "more transient, abnormal, illogical, impermanent, or unreliable", caused by unexpected inputs or something outside of the code.

== Etymology ==
Some reference books, including Random House's American Slang, state that the term comes from the German word glitschen 'to slip' as well as the Yiddish word glitshn 'to slide, to skid' and glitsh, meaning "slippery place". Glitch was used from the 1940s by radio announcers to refer to an on-air mistake. During the following decade, the term became used by television engineers to indicate technical problems.

According to a Wall Street Journal article written by Ben Zimmer, the Yale University law librarian Fred Shapiro came up with the new earliest use of the word yet found: May 19, 1940. That was when the novelist Katharine Brush wrote about glitch in her column "Out of My Mind" (syndicated in The Washington Post, The Boston Globe, and other papers). Brush corroborated Tony Randall's radio recollection:

When the radio talkers make a little mistake in diction they call it a "fluff," and when they make a bad one they call it a "glitch," and I love it.

Other examples from the world of radio can be found in the 1940s. The April 11, 1943, issue of The Washington Post carried a review of Helen Sioussat's book about radio broadcasting, Mikes Don't Bite. The reviewer noted an error and wrote, "In the lingo of radio, has Miss Sioussat pulled a 'muff,' 'fluff,' 'bust,' or 'glitch'?" In a 1948 book called The Advertising and Business Side of Radio, Ned Midgley explained how a radio station's "traffic department" was responsible for properly scheduling items in a broadcast. "Usually most 'glitches,' as on-the-air mistakes are called, can be traced to a mistake on the part of the traffic department", Midgley wrote.

In the 1950s, glitch made the transition from radio to television. In a 1953 ad in Broadcasting magazine, RCA boasted that their TV camera has "no more a-c power line 'glitches' (horizontal-bar interference)". Bell Telephone ran an ad in a 1955 issue of Billboard showing two technicians monitoring the TV signals that were broadcast on Bell System lines: "When he talks of 'glitch' with a fellow technician, he means a low frequency interference which appears as a narrow horizontal bar moving vertically through the picture".

A 1959 article in Sponsor, a trade magazine for television and radio advertisers, gave another technical usage in an article about editing TV commercials by splicing tape. "'Glitch' is slang for the 'momentary jiggle' that occurs at the editing point if the sync pulses don't match exactly in the splice". It also provided one of the earliest etymologies of the word, noting that, "'Glitch' probably comes from a German or Yiddish word meaning a slide, a glide or a slip".

It was first widely defined for the American people by Bennett Cerf on the June 20, 1965, episode of What's My Line as "a kink ... when anything goes wrong down there [Cape Kennedy], they say there's been a slight glitch". The astronaut John Glenn explained the term in his section of the book Into Orbit, writing that

Another term we adopted to describe some of our problems was "glitch". Literally, a glitch is a spike or change in voltage in an electrical circuit which takes place when the circuit suddenly has a new load put on it. You have probably noticed a dimming of lights in your home when you turn a switch or start the dryer or the television set. Normally, these changes in voltage are protected by fuses. A glitch, however, is such a minute change in voltage that no fuse could protect against it.

John Daly further defined the word on the July 4, 1965, episode of What's My Line, saying that it is a term used by the United States Air Force at Cape Kennedy, in the process of launching rockets, "it means something's gone wrong and you can't figure out what it is so you call it a 'glitch'". Later, on July 23, 1965, Time magazine felt it necessary to define it in an article: "Glitches—a spaceman's word for irritating disturbances". In relation to the reference by Time, the term has been believed to enter common usage during the American Space Race of the 1950s, where it was used to describe minor faults in the rocket hardware that were difficult to pinpoint.

The word itself is occasionally humorously described as being short for "gremlins lurking in the computer hardware".

== Electronics glitch ==
An electronics glitch or logic hazard is a transition that occurs on a signal before the signal settles to its intended value, particularly in a digital circuit. Generally, this implies an electrical pulse of short duration, often due to a race condition between two signals derived from a common source but with different delays. In some cases, such as a well-timed synchronous circuit, this could be a harmless and well-tolerated effect that occurs normally in a design. In other contexts, a glitch can represent an undesirable result of a fault or design error that can produce a malfunction. Some electronic components, such as flip-flops, are triggered by a pulse that must not be shorter than a specified minimum duration in order to function correctly; a pulse shorter than the specified minimum may be called a glitch. A related concept is the runt pulse, a pulse whose amplitude is smaller than the minimum level specified for correct operation, and a spike, a short pulse similar to a glitch but often caused by ringing or crosstalk.

== Computer glitch ==
A computer glitch is the failure of a system, usually containing a computing device, to complete its functions or to perform them properly. It frequently refers to an error which is not detected at the time it occurs but shows up later in data errors or incorrect human decisions. Situations which are frequently called computer glitches are incorrectly written software (software bugs), incorrect instructions given by the operator (operator errors, and a failure to account for this possibility might also be considered a software bug), undetected invalid input data (this might also be considered a software bug), undetected communications errors, computer viruses, Trojan attacks and computer exploiting (sometimes called "hacking").

Such glitches could produce problems such as keyboard malfunction, number key failures, screen abnormalities (turned left, right or upside-down), random program malfunctions, and abnormal program registering.

Examples of computer glitches causing disruption include an unexpected shutdown of a water filtration plant in New Canaan, 2010, failures in the Computer Aided Dispatch system used by the police in Austin, resulting in unresponded 911 calls, and an unexpected bit flip causing the Cassini spacecraft to enter "safe mode" in November 2010. Glitches can also be costly: in 2015, a bank was unable to raise interest rates for weeks resulting in losses of more than a million dollars per day.

== Video game glitches ==
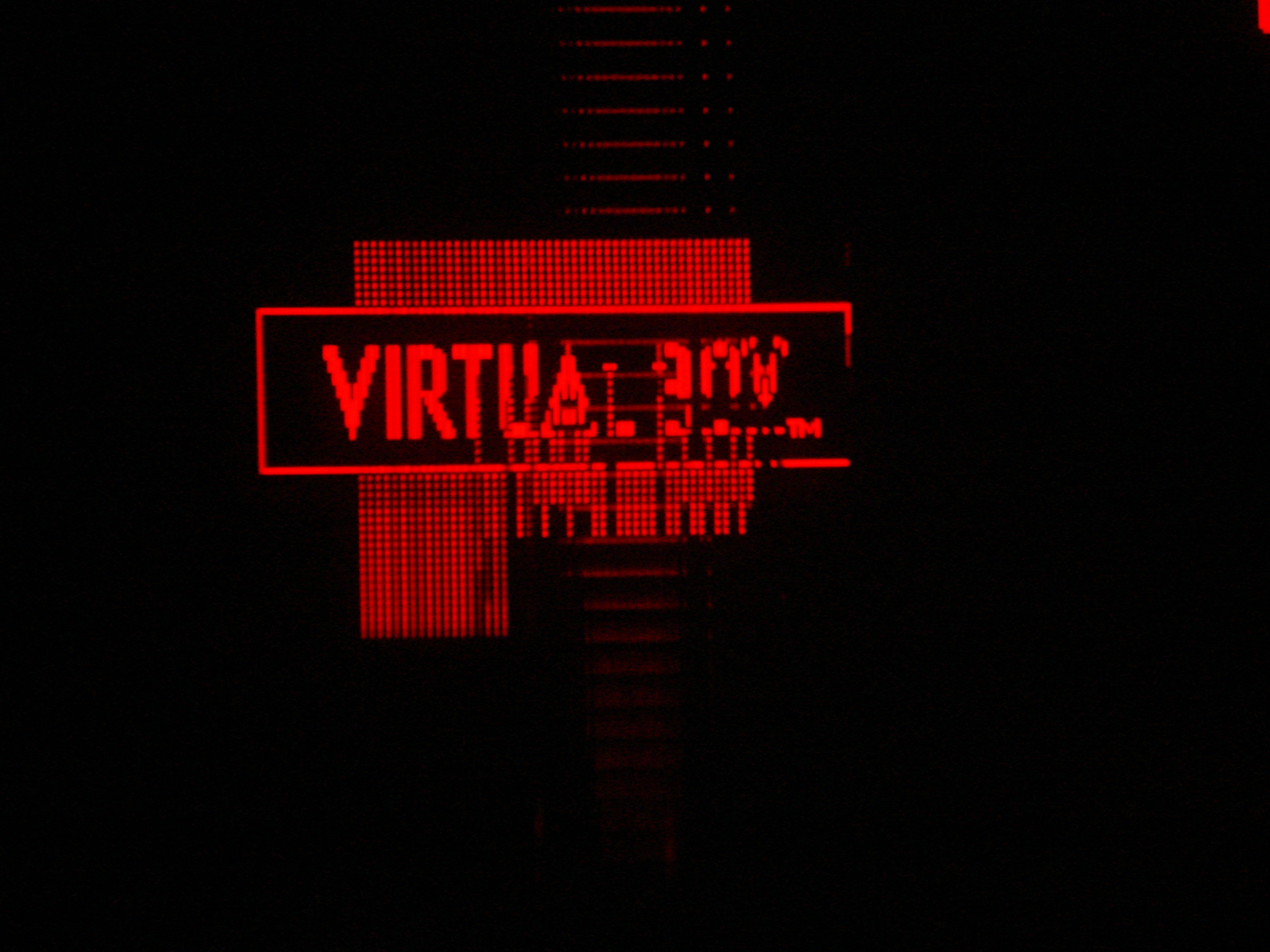
The start-up screen of the Virtual Boy is affected by a visual glitch.

Glitches in video games may include graphical and sound errors, collision detection problems, game crashes, and other issues. Quality assurance (QA) testers are commonly employed throughout the development process to find and report glitches to the programmers to be fixed, then potentially start over with a new build of the game. If insufficient bug fixes are performed, numerous glitches and bugs can make their way to the final product. Bethesda Softworks, for example, is notorious for the amount of glitches in their games, though some players even prefer them to a glitch-free experience.

Some players may seek to induce glitches in a game for fun, using methods such as cartridge tilting to disrupt the data flow.

"Glitch hunters" are fans of a game who search for beneficial glitches that will allow them to speedrun the game faster, usually by skipping portions of a level, or quickly defeating enemies. One example of a speedrunning scene with large amounts of glitch hunters is the Souls series. The use of glitches during speedruns is a controversial topic, with some frowning upon their use as subverting the intent of the developers. Those in favor of glitch use believe that using the glitches can in itself take a great deal of skill. Multiple categories of speedruns exist, with "any%" allowing the use of any type of glitch, while "glitchless" indicates the speedrun was performed without them.

Some games purposely include effects that look like glitches as a means to break the fourth wall and either scare the player or put the player at unease, or otherwise as part of the game's narrative. Games like Eternal Darkness and Batman: Arkham Asylum include segments with intentional glitches where it appears that the player's game system has failed. The Animus interface in the Assassin's Creed series, which allows the player-character to experience the memories of an ancestor though their genetic heritage, includes occasional glitches as to enforce the idea that the game is what the player-character is witnessing through a computer-aided system.

== Television glitch ==
In broadcasting, a corrupted signal may glitch in the form of jagged lines on the screen, misplaced squares, static looking effects, freezing problems, or inverted colors. The glitches may affect the video and/or audio (usually audio dropout) or the transmission. These glitches may be caused by a variety of issues, such as interference from portable electronics or microwaves, damaged cables at the broadcasting center, or weather.

== In popular culture ==
Multiple works of popular culture deal with glitches; those with the word "glitch" or derivations thereof are detailed in Glitch (disambiguation).

- The nonfiction book CB Bible (1976) includes glitch in its glossary of citizens band radio slang, defining it as "an indefinable technical defect in CB equipment", indicating the term was already then in use on citizens band.
- The short film The Glitch (2008), opening film and best science fiction finalist at Dragon Con Independent Film Festival 2008, deals with the disorientation of late-night TV viewer Harry Owen (Scott Charles Blamphin), who experiences "heavy brain-splitting digital breakdowns".

== See also ==
- Fuzzing
- Glitch art
- Glitch removal
- Hazard (logic)
- Hardware bug
- Software bug
