= Runt pulse =

Digital signal that does not reach a valid high or low level

In digital circuits, a runt pulse is a narrow pulse that, due to non-zero rise and fall times of the signal, does not reach a valid high or low level. A runt pulse may occur when switching between asynchronous clocks; or as the result of a race condition in which a signal takes two separate paths through a circuit, which may have different delays, and is then recombined to form a glitch; or when the output of a flip-flop becomes metastable.

== Example ==
Some oscilloscopes provide a method for triggering on runt pulses. The oscilloscope triggers when the signal crosses one of two voltage thresholds, but not both.
