= Albert A. Mullin =

Albert Alkins Mullin
- Born: August 25, 1933; Lynn, Massachusetts
- Died: May 16th 2017; Huntsville, Alabama
- Occupations: Engineer and mathematician
- Spouse: Lorraine Agacinski Mullin
- Children: David Albert Mullin, Edward LeRoy Mullin, Carolyn Mullin Kaplan, Dorothy Mullin Puckett
- Parent(s): LeRoy Allen Mullin, Alleyne Alkins Mullin

Albert Mullin (August 25, 1933 – May 16, 2017) was an American engineer and mathematician who is best known for defining the Euclid–Mullin sequence.

== Biography ==
=== Early life ===
Albert Mullin was born on August 25, 1933, to LeRoy Mullin and Alleyne Mullin in Lynn, Massachusetts. He earned his bachelor's degree in electrical engineering from Syracuse University in 1955. He went on to earn a master's degree in electrical engineering from MIT and a master's degree in mathematics from the University of Illinois.

=== Career ===
Albert became a commissioned Army officer and served for a period of 38 years. He retired from the Army in 1993 having attained the rank of Colonel. He continued to serve as an army civilian with the Space and Strategic Command. During his time as an Army officer and continuing on through his death he was a periodic contributor to the Journal of the American Mathematical Society, the Journal of Symbolic Logic, and the Notre Dame Journal of Formal Logic.

== Honors ==
- Bronze Star Medal

== Bibliography ==
- Research Problem 8: Recursive function theory (A modern look at a Euclidean idea), Bull. Amer. Math. Soc., 69 (1963), 737.
- Review: M. D. Mesarovic and Y. Takahara, General systems theory: Mathematical foundations, Bull. Amer. Math. Soc., 81 (1975), 1047–1044.
- On new theorems for elementary number theory, Notre Dame Journal of Formal Logic, Vol. 8, Issue 4 1967, 353–356.
- A note on a weakened Goldbach-like conjecture, Notre Dame Journal of Formal Logic, Vol. 3, Issue 2 1962, 118–119.

== See also ==
- Euclid–Mullin sequence
