= Consensus theorem =

Theorem in Boolean algebra

Variable inputs			Function values	
x	y	z	$xy \vee \bar{x}z \vee yz$	$xy \vee \bar{x}z$
0	0	0	0	0
0	0	1	1	1
0	1	0	0	0
0	1	1	1	1
1	0	0	0	0
1	0	1	0	0
1	1	0	1	1
1	1	1	1	1

Karnaugh map of AB ∨ A̅C ∨ BC. Omitting the red rectangle does not change the covered area.

In Boolean algebra, the consensus theorem or rule of consensus is the identity:

$$xy \vee \bar{x}z \vee yz = xy \vee \bar{x}z$$

The consensus or resolvent of the terms $xy$ and $\bar{x}z$ is $yz$. It is the conjunction of all the unique literals of the terms, excluding the literal that appears unnegated in one term and negated in the other. If $y$ includes a term that is negated in $z$ (or vice versa), the consensus term $yz$ is false; in other words, there is no consensus term.

The conjunctive dual of this equation is:

$$(x \vee y)(\bar{x} \vee z)(y \vee z) = (x \vee y)(\bar{x} \vee z)$$

== Proof ==
$$\begin{align}
xy \vee \bar{x}z \vee yz &=  xy \vee \bar{x}z \vee (x \vee \bar{x})yz \\
&=  xy \vee \bar{x}z \vee xyz \vee \bar{x}yz \\
&=  (xy \vee xyz) \vee (\bar{x}z \vee \bar{x}yz) \\
&= xy(1\vee z)\vee\bar{x}z(1\vee y) \\
&=  xy \vee \bar{x}z
\end{align}$$

== Consensus ==
The consensus or consensus term of two conjunctive terms of a disjunction is defined when one term contains the literal $a$ and the other the literal $\bar{a}$, an opposition. The consensus is the conjunction of the two terms, omitting both $a$ and $\bar{a}$, and repeated literals. For example, the consensus of $\bar{x}yz$ and $w\bar{y}z$ is $w\bar{x}z$. The consensus is undefined if there is more than one opposition.

For the conjunctive dual of the rule, the consensus $y \vee z$ can be derived from $(x\vee y)$ and $(\bar{x} \vee z)$ through the resolution inference rule. This shows that the LHS is derivable from the RHS (if A → B then A → AB; replacing A with RHS and B with (y ∨ z) ). The RHS can be derived from the LHS simply through the conjunction elimination inference rule. Since RHS → LHS and LHS → RHS (in propositional calculus), then LHS = RHS (in Boolean algebra).

== Applications ==
In Boolean algebra, repeated consensus is the core of one algorithm for calculating the Blake canonical form of a formula.

In digital logic, including the consensus term in a circuit can eliminate race hazards.

== History ==
The concept of consensus was introduced by Archie Blake in 1937, related to the Blake canonical form. It was rediscovered by Samson and Mills in 1954 and by Quine in 1955. Quine coined the term 'consensus'. Robinson used it for clauses in 1965 as the basis of his "resolution principle".
