= GLitcH! =

Comic strip by Ed Wiens

- Author: Ed Wiens
- Launch date: 1996
- End date: 2003

GLitcH! is a comic strip written by Ed Wiens which focuses on the adventures and mis-adventures that "Norb" and Norb's family & friends have with "GLitcH", Norb's computer.

The comic strip has been in production since 1996 and is self-syndicated in Edmonton, Alberta, Canada.

Beginning with a circulation base of only several hundred in a newsletter for a Government of Alberta newsletter, publication of GLitcH! comics grew yearly in circulation numbers to approximately 1.2 million pieces of print per month by 1998 and was distributed in five major regions in Canada. A self-published book entitled "GLitcH! How Do You Start This Thing?" was also printed in 2001.

The strip went into hiatus in 2003.

Articles by the author on the art and business of cartooning can be found at http://www.glitch.ca
