= Gorodnyansky Uyezd =

Administrative subdivision in Russian Empire

Gorodnyansky Uyezd (Russian: Городнянский уезд; Ukrainian: Городнянський повіт, romanized: Horodnianskyi povit) was one of the subdivisions of the Chernigov Governorate of the Russian Empire. It was situated in the western part of the governorate. Its administrative centre was Gorodnya (Horodnia).

== Demographics ==
At the time of the Russian Empire Census of 1897, Gorodnyansky Uyezd had a population of 162,123. Of these, 86.8% spoke Ukrainian, 7.8% Russian, 4.6% Yiddish, 0.3% Polish, 0.3% Belarusian and 0.1% German as their native language.
