= Archie Blake (mathematician) =

American mathematician (1906–1971)

Signature of Archie Blake

Charles Archibald Blake (November 24, 1906 - January 7, 1971), name officially changed to Archie Blake was an American mathematician. He is well known for the Blake canonical form, a normal form for expressions in propositional logic. In order to compute the canonical form, he moreover introduced the concept of consensus, which was a precursor of the resolution principle, today a common technique in automated theorem proving.

== Career ==
In 1930, he became a member of the American Mathematical Society (AMS). He presented his canonical form at the AMS meeting at Columbia University on 29 Oct 1932. In 1937, this work lead to a Ph.D. from the University of Chicago, supervised by Raymond Walter Barnard.

He worked for the United States Coast and Geodetic Survey in Washington, D.C., from 1936 (or earlier) as a mathematician, since 1938 as an Assistant Mathematician, and since 1939 as an Associated Mathematician. In 1946, he was appointed a Senior Statistician in the Office of the Army Surgeon General, Washington, D.C. He also worked for the Cornell Aeronautical Laboratory in Buffalo, New York. From there, he changed in 1954 to the Westinghouse Electric Corporation in Baltimore, Md., where he became an Advisory Engineer. In 1956, he moved from Westinghouse to the Bendix Aviation Corporation, as a Systems Staff Mathematician. In 1960, he became a Manager of the Analysis Section of Raytheon in Sudbury, Massachusetts.

== Publications ==
- Archie Blake (Jun 1931). A set of postulates for a generalized number system (Master's thesis). University of Chicago. OCLC 43268249.
- Archie Blake (1938). Canonical Expressions in Boolean Algebra (Ph.D. thesis). University of Chicago. — Review in the Journal of Symbolic Logic — Abstract in Bulletin of the AMS, Vol.38, No.11, Nov 1932, p.6(805)
- Archie Blake (1940). "Mathematical problems in seismology". Transactions of the American Geophysical Union. 21 (4): 1094–1113. Bibcode:1940TrAGU..21.1094B. doi:10.1029/TR021i004p01094. hdl:2027/mdp.39015094985945. S2CID 4124975. — Also presented at the AMS 46th annual meeting, 26-29 Dec 1939 at the Ohio State University, Columbus, Ohio
- Archie Blake (Mar 1941). "The exploratory determination of statistical distributions" (PDF). Bulletin of the AMS. 47 (3): 216 (abstract only).
- Archie Blake (Sep 1946). "A Boolean Derivation of the Moore-Osgood Theorem". The Journal of Symbolic Logic. 11 (3): 65–70. doi:10.2307/2266733. JSTOR 2266733. S2CID 43141661.
- Archie Blake (1946). "Criteria for the reality of apparent periodicities and other regularities" (PDF). Travaux Scientifiques, Series A. 16. IASPEI: 3–7. OCLC 627514037.
