= List of quantum algorithms =

List of quantum computing algorithms

This is a list of quantum algorithms, including algorithms, algorithmic techniques, computational models, and problem frameworks used in quantum computing. A quantum algorithm is an algorithm designed to run on a quantum computer or on another formal model of quantum computation. Quantum algorithms are often grouped by the mathematical technique used, such as the quantum Fourier transform, amplitude amplification, quantum walks, phase estimation, or hybrid quantum-classical optimization.

== Foundational and oracle algorithms ==
Algorithm or problem	Description
Deutsch–Jozsa algorithm	Determines whether a black-box Boolean function is constant or balanced
Bernstein–Vazirani algorithm	Determines a hidden bit string encoded in a black-box function
Simon's problem	Finds a hidden period in a function and helped inspire later period-finding algorithms
Hidden subgroup problem	General framework for many quantum algorithms based on hidden algebraic structure
Hidden shift problem	Problem of finding a shift relating two functions
Hidden linear function problem	Oracle problem involving a hidden linear function

== Fourier transform, phase estimation, and algebraic algorithms ==
Algorithm or technique	Description
Quantum Fourier transform	Quantum analogue of the discrete Fourier transform, used in several quantum algorithms
Hadamard transform	Transform used in many quantum circuits and query algorithms
Quantum phase estimation algorithm	Estimates the phase of an eigenvalue of a unitary operator
Hadamard test	Circuit technique for estimating real or imaginary parts of expectation values
Swap test	Estimates the overlap or similarity between quantum states
Shor's algorithm	Factoring and discrete-logarithm algorithm with major implications for public-key cryptography
Aharonov–Jones–Landau algorithm	Quantum algorithm related to approximating the Jones polynomial

== Search and amplitude-amplification algorithms ==
Algorithm or technique	Description
Grover's algorithm	Search algorithm giving a quadratic speedup for unstructured search
Amplitude amplification	Generalization of Grover's algorithm used to amplify the probability of desired outcomes
Quantum counting algorithm	Estimates the number of marked items in a search space
Quantum sort	Quantum algorithmic approach to sorting
BHT algorithm	Quantum algorithm for the Collision problem

== Quantum walk algorithms ==
Algorithm or model	Description
Quantum walk	Quantum analogue of a classical random walk
Continuous-time quantum walk	Quantum-walk model in which the system evolves continuously in time
Quantum walk search	Search algorithms based on quantum walks

== Simulation and linear-algebra algorithms ==
Algorithm or technique	Description
Hamiltonian simulation	Problem and family of quantum algorithms for simulating the time evolution of quantum systems governed by a Hamiltonian
Feynman's algorithm	Early quantum-computing approach associated with simulating quantum systems
Path integral Monte Carlo	Monte Carlo method related to path-integral formulations of quantum systems
HHL algorithm	Quantum algorithm for solving certain systems of linear equations
Quantum singular value transformation	Framework for transforming singular values of encoded matrices

== Optimization and variational algorithms ==
Algorithm or family	Description
Quantum annealing	Optimization approach based on adiabatic evolution or annealing-like quantum dynamics
Quantum optimization algorithms	Family of quantum algorithms for optimization problems
Quantum approximate optimization algorithm	Hybrid quantum-classical algorithm for approximate combinatorial optimization, based on alternating cost and mixer Hamiltonians
Variational quantum eigensolver	Hybrid quantum-classical algorithm for estimating ground-state energies

== Sampling and non-local computation ==
Algorithm or model	Description
Boson sampling	Sampling problem using noninteracting bosons, often discussed in relation to quantum advantage
Non-local quantum computation	Quantum-information task involving separated parties and nonlocal operations
Quantum artificial life	Quantum-computing model inspired by artificial life and biological systems

== See also ==
- Adiabatic quantum computation
- BQP
- Glossary of quantum computing
- List of algorithms
- List of artificial intelligence algorithms
- List of quantum and post-quantum cryptography
- List of quantum computing journals
- List of quantum processors
- List of quantum software
- Quantum circuit
- Quantum complexity theory
- Quantum information science
- Quantum programming
- Quantum supremacy
