= BHT algorithm =

Quantum algorithm

In quantum computing, the Brassard–Høyer–Tapp (BHT) algorithm is a quantum algorithm that solves the collision problem. In this problem, one is given n and an 2-to-1 function $f:\,\{1,\ldots,n\}\rightarrow\{1,\ldots,n\}$ and needs to find two inputs that f maps to the same output. The BHT algorithm only makes $O(n^{1/3})$ queries to f, which matches the lower bound of $\Omega(n^{1/3})$ in the black box model. The algorithm can be generalized to r-to-1 function with a complexity of $O\left(\left(\frac{n}{r}\right)^{1/3}\right)$.

The algorithm was discovered by Gilles Brassard, Peter Høyer, and Alain Tapp in 1997. It uses Grover's algorithm, which was discovered the year before.

== Algorithm ==
Intuitively, the algorithm combines the square root speedup from the birthday paradox using (classical) randomness with the square root speedup from Grover's (quantum) algorithm.

First, n^{1/3} inputs to f are selected at random and f is queried at all of them. If there is a collision among these inputs, then we return the colliding pair of inputs. Otherwise, all these inputs map to distinct values by f. Then Grover's algorithm is used to find a new input to f that collides. Since there are n inputs to f and n^{1/3} of these could form a collision with the already queried values, Grover's algorithm can find a collision with $O\left(\sqrt{\frac{n}{n^{1/3}}}\right) = O(n^{1/3})$ extra queries to f.

== See also ==
- Element distinctness problem
- Grover's algorithm
