= Hadamard test =

Technique in quantum computation

Circuit for the Hadamard test

In quantum computation, the Hadamard test is a method used to create a random variable whose expected value is the expected real part $\mathrm{Re}\langle\psi| U|\psi\rangle$, where $|\psi\rangle$ is a quantum state and $U$ is a unitary gate acting on the space of $|\psi\rangle$. The Hadamard test produces a random variable whose image is in $\{\pm 1\}$ and whose expected value is exactly $\mathrm{Re}\langle\psi| U|\psi\rangle$. It is possible to modify the circuit to produce a random variable whose expected value is $\mathrm{Im}\langle\psi| U|\psi\rangle$ by applying an $S^{\dagger}$ gate after the first Hadamard gate.

== Description of the circuit ==
To perform the Hadamard test we first calculate the state $\frac{1}{\sqrt{2}}\left(\left|0\right\rangle +\left|1\right\rangle \right)\otimes\left|\psi\right\rangle$. We then apply the unitary operator on $\left|\psi\right\rangle$ conditioned on the first qubit to obtain the state $\frac{1}{\sqrt{2}}\left(\left|0\right\rangle \otimes\left|\psi\right\rangle +\left|1\right\rangle \otimes U\left|\psi\right\rangle \right)$. We then apply the Hadamard gate to the first qubit, yielding $\frac{1}{2}\left(\left|0\right\rangle \otimes(I+U)\left|\psi\right\rangle +\left|1\right\rangle \otimes (I-U)\left|\psi\right\rangle \right)$.

Measuring the first qubit, the result is $\left|0\right\rangle$ with probability $\frac{1}{4}\langle\psi| (I+U^\dagger)(I+U)|\psi \rangle$, in which case we output $1$. The result is $\left|1\right\rangle$ with probability $\frac{1}{4}\langle\psi | (I-U^\dagger)(I-U)| \psi \rangle$, in which case we output $-1$. The expected value of the output will then be the difference between the two probabilities, which is $\frac{1}{2} \langle\psi| (U^\dagger+U)| \psi \rangle = \mathrm{Re}\langle\psi | U| \psi \rangle$

To obtain a random variable whose expectation is $\mathrm{Im}\langle\psi | U | \psi \rangle$ follow exactly the same procedure but start with $\frac{1}{\sqrt{2}}\left(\left|0\right\rangle -i\left|1\right\rangle \right)\otimes\left|\psi\right\rangle$.

== Applications ==
The Hadamard test has many applications in quantum algorithms such as the Aharonov–Jones–Landau algorithm. Via a very simple modification it can be used to compute inner product between two states $|\phi_1\rangle$ and $|\phi_2\rangle$: instead of starting from a state $|\psi\rangle$ it suffice to start from the ground state $|0\rangle$, and perform two controlled operations on the ancilla qubit. Controlled on the ancilla register being $|0\rangle$, we apply the unitary that produces $|\phi_1\rangle$ in the second register, and controlled on the ancilla register being in the state $|1\rangle$, we create $|\phi_2\rangle$ in the second register. The expected value of the measurements of the ancilla qubits leads to an estimate of $\langle \phi_1|\phi_2\rangle$. The number of samples needed to estimate the expected value with absolute error $\epsilon$ is $O\left(\frac{1}{\epsilon^2}\right)$, because of a Chernoff bound. This value can be improved to $O\left(\frac{1}{\epsilon}\right)$ using amplitude estimation techniques.

== See also ==
- Swap test
