= Andris Ambainis =

Latvian computer scientist

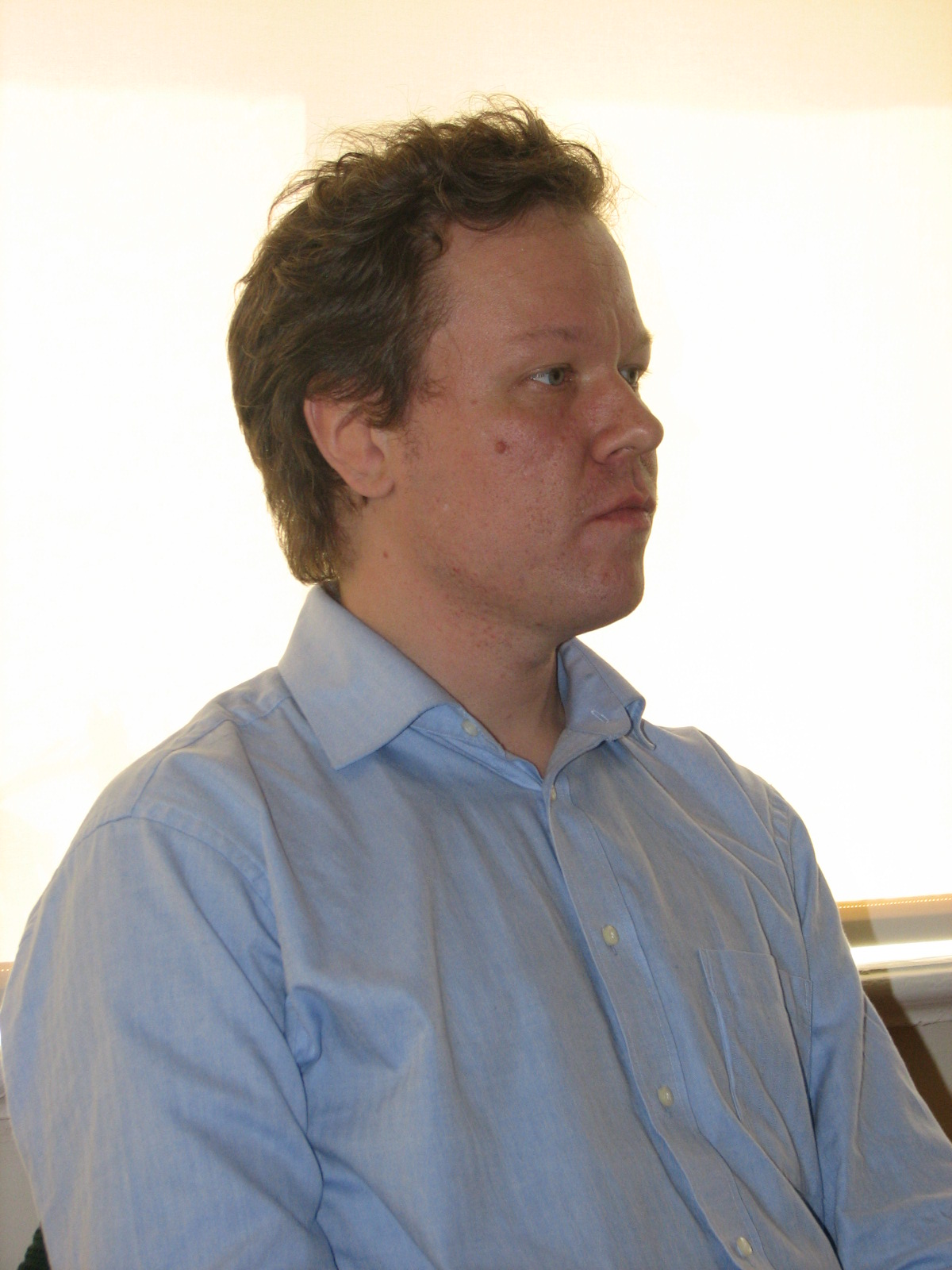
- Born: 18 January 1975 (age 51); Daugavpils, Latvia
- Education: University of Latvia; University of California, Berkeley
- Known for: Quantum walks Quantum algorithms Quantum complexity theory
- Awards: International Mathematical Olympiad gold medal (1991)
- Scientific career
- Fields: Quantum information Quantum computing Theoretical computer science
- Institutions: University of Latvia
- Doctoral advisor: Umesh Vazirani

Andris Ambainis (born 18 January 1975) is a Latvian computer scientist active in the fields of quantum information theory and quantum computing.

== Education and career ==
Ambainis has held past positions at the Institute for Advanced Study at Princeton, New Jersey and the Institute for Quantum Computing at the University of Waterloo. He is currently a professor in the Faculty of Computing at the University of Latvia.

He received a Bachelors (1996), Masters (1997), and Doctorate (1997) in Computer Science from the University of Latvia, as well as a PhD (2001) from the University of California, Berkeley.

== Contributions ==
Ambainis has contributed extensively to quantum information processing and foundations of quantum mechanics, mostly through his work on quantum walks and lower bounds for quantum query complexity.

== Recognition ==
In 1991 he received a perfect score and gold medal at the International Mathematical Olympiad. He won an Alfred P. Sloan Fellowship in 2008. Ambainis was an invited speaker at the 2018 International Congress of Mathematicians, speaking on mathematical aspects of computer science.
