= Lov Grover =

Indian-American computer scientist (born 1961)

- Born: Lov Kumar Grover; 1961 (age 64–65); Meerut, India
- Education: Indian Institute of Technology, Delhi; Stanford University
- Known for: Grover's algorithm Amplitude amplification
- Scientific career
- Workplaces: Bell Labs; Cornell University
- Thesis: New concepts in free electron lasers (1985)

Lov Kumar Grover (born 1961) is an Indian-American computer scientist. He is the originator of the Grover database search algorithm used in quantum computing. Grover's 1996 algorithm won renown as the second major algorithm proposed for quantum computing (after Shor's 1994 algorithm), and in 2017 was finally implemented in a scalable physical quantum system. Grover's algorithm has been the subject of numerous popular science articles.

== Life ==
Lov Kumar Grover was born in Meerut, India in 1961. Grover received his bachelor's degree from the Indian Institute of Technology, Delhi in 1981 and his PhD in electrical engineering from Stanford University in 1985. In 1984, he went to Bell Laboratories. He worked as a visiting professor at Cornell University from 1987 to 1994. He retired in 2008, becoming an independent researcher.

== Publications ==
- Grover L.K.: A fast quantum mechanical algorithm for database search, Proceedings, 28th Annual ACM Symposium on the Theory of Computing, (May 1996) p. 212
- Grover L.K.: From Schrödinger's equation to quantum search algorithm, American Journal of Physics, 69(7): 769–777, 2001. Pedagogical review of the algorithm and its history.
- Grover L.K.: Quantum Computing: How the weird logic of the subatomic world could make it possible for machines to calculate millions of times faster than they do today The Sciences, July/August 1999, pp. 24–30.
- What's a Quantum Phone Book?, Lov Grover, Lucent Technologies
