= Machine learning in physics =

Applications of machine learning to quantum physics

Applying machine learning (ML) (including deep learning) methods to the study of quantum systems is an emergent area of physics research. A basic example of this is quantum state tomography, where a quantum state is learned from measurement. Other examples include learning Hamiltonians,, detecting phase transition in spin-systems even when not trained on physical configurations near criticality, learning quantum phase transitions, and automatically generating new quantum experiments. ML is effective at processing large amounts of experimental or calculated data in order to characterize an unknown quantum system, making its application useful in contexts including quantum information theory, quantum technology development, and computational materials design. In this context, for example, it can be used as a tool to interpolate pre-calculated interatomic potentials, or directly solving the Schrödinger equation with a variational method.

== Applications ==
=== Noisy data ===
The ability to experimentally control and prepare increasingly complex quantum systems brings with it a growing need to turn large and noisy data sets into meaningful information. This is a problem that has already been studied extensively in the classical setting, and consequently, many existing machine learning techniques can be naturally adapted to more efficiently address experimentally relevant problems. For example, Bayesian methods and concepts of algorithmic learning can be fruitfully applied to tackle quantum state classification, Hamiltonian learning, and the characterization of an unknown unitary transformation. Other problems that have been addressed with this approach are given in the following list:

- Identifying an accurate model for the dynamics of a quantum system, through the reconstruction of the Hamiltonian;
- Extracting information on unknown states;
- Learning unknown unitary transformations and measurements;
- Engineering of quantum gates from qubit networks with pairwise interactions, using time dependent or independent Hamiltonians.
- Improving the extraction accuracy of physical observables from absorption images of ultracold atoms (degenerate Fermi gas), by the generation of an ideal reference frame.

=== Calculated and noise-free data ===
Quantum machine learning can also be applied to dramatically accelerate the prediction of quantum properties of molecules and materials. This can be helpful for the computational design of new molecules or materials. Some examples include

- Interpolating interatomic potentials;
- Inferring molecular atomization energies throughout chemical compound space;
- Accurate potential energy surfaces with restricted Boltzmann machines;
- Automatic generation of new quantum experiments;
- Solving the many-body, static and time-dependent Schrödinger equation;
- Identifying phase transitions from entanglement spectra;
- Generating adaptive feedback schemes for quantum metrology and quantum tomography.

=== Variational circuits ===
Variational circuits are a family of algorithms which utilize training based on circuit parameters and an objective function. Variational circuits are generally composed of a classical device communicating input parameters (random or pre-trained parameters) into a quantum device, along with a classical mathematical optimization function. These circuits are very heavily dependent on the architecture of the proposed quantum device because parameter adjustments are adjusted based solely on the classical components within the device. Though the application is considerably infantile in the field of quantum machine learning, it has incredibly high promise for more efficiently generating efficient optimization functions.

=== Sign problem ===
Machine learning techniques can be used to find a better manifold of integration for path integrals in order to avoid the sign problem.

=== Fluid dynamics ===
Physics-informed neural networks have been used to solve partial differential equations in both forward and inverse problems in a data driven manner. One example is the reconstructing fluid flow governed by the Navier-Stokes equations. Using physics informed neural networks does not require the often expensive mesh generation that conventional CFD methods rely on. It is evident that geometric and physical constraints have a synergistic effect on neural PDE surrogates, thereby enhancing their efficacy in predicting stable and super long rollouts.

=== Physics discovery and prediction ===
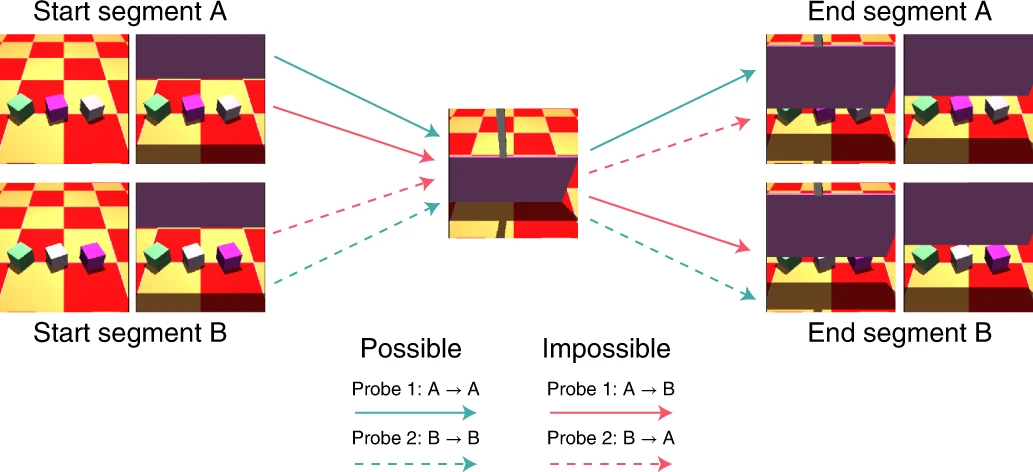
Illustration of how an AI learns the basic fundamental physical concept of 'unchangeableness'

A deep learning system was reported to learn intuitive physics from visual data (of virtual 3D environments) based on an unpublished approach inspired by studies of visual cognition in infants. Other researchers have developed a machine learning algorithm that could discover sets of basic variables of various physical systems and predict the systems' future dynamics from video recordings of their behavior. In the future, it may be possible that such can be used to automate the discovery of physical laws of complex systems. Beyond discovery and prediction, "blank slate"-type of learning of fundamental aspects of the physical world may have further applications such as improving adaptive and broad artificial general intelligence. In specific, prior machine learning models were "highly specialised and lack a general understanding of the world".

=== Physics-informed neural networks ===
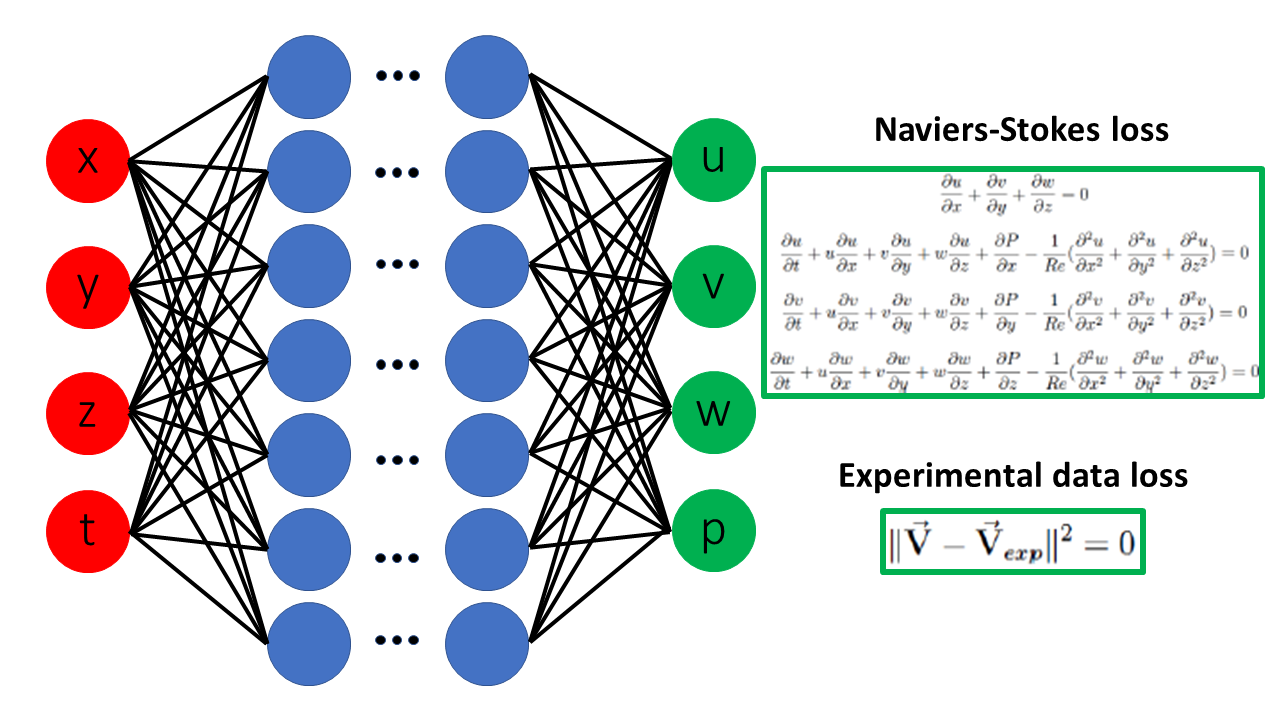
Physics-informed neural networks for solving Navier–Stokes equations

In machine learning, physics-informed neural networks (PINNs), also referred to as theory-trained neural networks (TTNs), are a type of universal function approximator that can embed the knowledge of any physical laws that govern a given data-set in the learning process, and can be described by partial differential equations (PDEs). Low data availability for some biological and engineering problems limit the robustness of conventional machine learning models used for these applications. The prior knowledge of general physical laws acts in the training of neural networks (NNs) as a regularization agent that limits the space of admissible solutions, increasing the generalizability of the function approximation. This way, embedding this prior information into a neural network results in enhancing the information content of the available data, facilitating the learning algorithm to capture the right solution and to generalize well even with a low amount of training examples. Because they process continuous spatial and time coordinates and output continuous PDE solutions, they can be categorized as neural fields.

=== Quantum machine learning ===
Quantum machine learning (QML) is the study of quantum algorithms for machine learning. It often refers to quantum algorithms for machine learning tasks which analyze classical data, sometimes called quantum-enhanced machine learning.

QML algorithms use qubits and quantum operations to try to improve the space and time complexity of classical machine learning algorithms. Hybrid QML methods involve both classical and quantum processing, where computationally difficult subroutines are outsourced to a quantum device. These routines can be more complex in nature and executed faster on a quantum computer. Furthermore, quantum algorithms can be used to analyze quantum states instead of classical data.

The term "quantum machine learning" is sometimes used to refer classical machine learning methods applied to data generated from quantum experiments (i.e. machine learning of quantum systems), such as learning the phase transitions of a quantum system or creating new quantum experiments.

QML also extends to a branch of research that explores methodological and structural similarities between certain physical systems and learning systems, in particular neural networks. For example, some mathematical and numerical techniques from quantum physics are applicable to classical deep learning and vice versa.

Furthermore, researchers investigate more abstract notions of learning theory with respect to quantum information, sometimes referred to as "quantum learning theory".

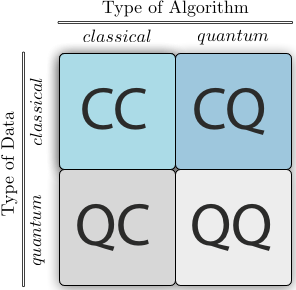
Four different approaches to combine the disciplines of quantum computing and machine learning. The first letter refers to whether the system under study is classical or quantum, while the second letter defines whether a classical or quantum information processing device is used.

== See also ==
- Quantum computing
- Quantum machine learning
- Quantum annealing
- Quantum neural network
- HHL Algorithm
- Comparison of machine learning software
