= David Horn (Israeli physicist) =

Professor of Physics (born 1937)

- דוד הורן
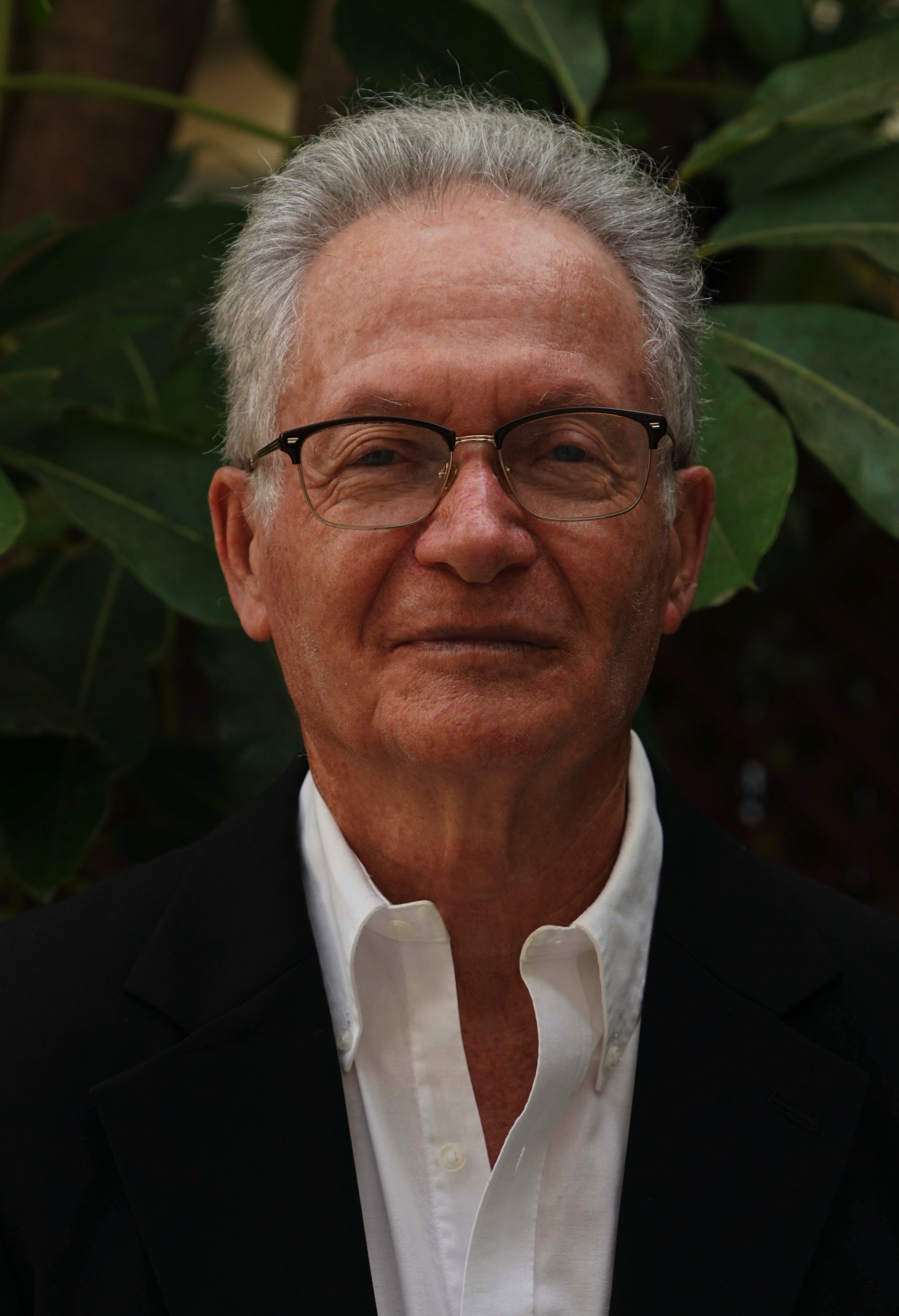
- Born: 10 September 1937 (age 89); Haifa, Mandatory Palestine (now Israel)
- Education: Hebrew University; Technion
- Scientific career
- Fields: Physics, Neural Computation, Bioinformatics
- Workplaces: Tel Aviv University
- Thesis: Some Aspects of the Structure of Weak Interactions (1965)
- Doctoral advisor: Yuval Ne'eman

David Horn (Hebrew: דוד הורן; born 10 September 1937) is a Professor (Emeritus) of Physics in the School of Physics and Astronomy at Tel Aviv University (TAU), Israel. He has served as Vice-Rector of TAU, Chairman of the School of Physics and Astronomy and as Dean of the Faculty of Exact Sciences in TAU. He is a fellow of the American Physical Society, nominated for "contributions to theoretical particle physics, including the seminal work on finite energy sum rules, research of the phenomenology of hadronic processes, and investigation of Hamiltonian lattice theories".

== Early life and education ==
David Horn was born and educated in Haifa. He graduated from the Reali School in 1955. He began his academic studies in Physics at the Technion in Haifa in 1957, and received his B.Sc. (Summa Cum Laude) in 1961, and M.Sc. in 1962. He continued his Ph.D. studies at the Hebrew University of Jerusalem until 1965. His thesis on "Some Aspects of the Structure of Weak Interactions" was supervised by Prof. Yuval Ne'eman.

== Career ==
Horn joined the newly founded Tel Aviv University as an assistant in 1962. He became a lecturer in 1965, a senior lecturer in 1967 and an associate professor in 1968. He was promoted to full professor of Physics in 1972. In 1974 he became the incumbent of the Edouard and Francoise Jaupart Chair of Theoretical Physics of Particles and Fields, a position he held until 2007. Horn has supervised 43 graduate students at TAU and authored over 240 scientific publications. He retired as a professor emeritus in 2005, and continues to be an active researcher.

Horn spent a significant part of his career holding visiting academic positions at other universities and research institutes, including: Postdoctoral Fellow at Argonne National Lab, ILL, Research Fellow and three times Visiting Associate at California Institute of Technology, Pasadena, CA, Visitor at CERN in Geneva, Visiting Professor at Cornell University, NY, Member of the Institute for Advanced Study, Princeton, NJ, Visiting Professor at SLAC in Stanford University, CA, and Visiting Professor at Kyoto University, Japan.

Beginning from 1980, Horn held official positions at Tel Aviv University, starting with tenure as Vice-Rector (1980-1983), a position he left for research at SLAC. After returning he was nominated Chairman of the Department of High Energy Physics (1984-1986), followed by tenures as Chairman of the School of Physics and Astronomy (1986-9), Dean of the Raymond and Beverly Sackler Faculty of Exact Sciences (1990-1995), and first Director of the Adams Super Center for Brain Studies (1993-2000).

Horn has also held national and international professional positions. He was Chairman of the Israel Commission for High Energy Physics (1983-2003), and, in this capacity, served as an Israeli observer of the council of CERN (1991-2003). He served as member of the Israel Council for Higher Education (1987-1991), member of the Executive Committee of the European Physical Society (1989-1992) and member of the European Strategy Forum on Research Infrastructures (2005-2017). He chaired the Israeli Committee of Research Infrastructures (2012-2016), issuing roadmaps for scientific RI in 2013 and 2016.

== Research ==
Horn's research work focused on theory and phenomenology of High Energy Physics until 1990. He then shifted his interests to Neural Computation and Machine Learning and, since 2005, he has also published in Bioinformatics.

Together with Richard Dolen and Christoph Schmid he discovered the Finite Energy Sum Rules in 1967. It was a realization of the bootstrap approach to hadronic structure, and became known as the Dolen-Horn-Schmid Duality.

Together with Richard Silver he investigated a model of coherent production of pions at high energy hadron collisions in 1971, and together with Jeffrey Mandula he undertook the investigation of mesons with constituent gluons in 1978. Moving to lattice gauge theories in 1979, he discovered, together with Shimon Yankielowic and Marvin Weinstein, a non-confining phase in Z(N) theories for large N. In 1981 he demonstrated the existence of finite matrix models with link gauge fields, nowadays known as quantum link models. In 1984 Horn and Weinstein developed the t-expansion methodology.

Horn's contributions to neural modeling include a novel mechanism for memory maintenance via neuronal regulation in 1998, developed with Nir Levy and Eytan Ruppin and unsupervised learning of natural languages in 2005, a joint work with Zach Solan, Eytan Ruppin and Shimon Edelman, introducing novel algorithms for motif and grammar extraction from text. Horn has contributed to algorithms of clustering, an important topic in Machine Learning, by developing Support Vector Clustering (SVC) in 2001, together with Asa Ben Hur, Hava Siegelmann and Vladimir Vapnik. This was followed shortly thereafter by a joint work with Assaf Gottlieb on Quantum Clustering (QC).

His contributions to Bioinformatics include motif descriptions of function and structure of proteins, as well as motif studies of genomic structures. Together with Erez Persi he studied compositional order of proteomes, and repeat instability of genomes, as evolution markers of organisms and of cancer (a joint work with Persi and others).

== Honors ==
Horn is a Fellow of the American Physical Society (1985) and a Fellow of the Israel Physical Society (2018).

== Publications ==
=== Selected articles ===
- R. Dolen, D. Horn and C. Schmid; Prediction of Regge-parameters of rho poles from low-energy pi-N scattering data Phys. Rev. Lett. 19 (1967) 402–407. Finite-Energy Sum Rules and Their Application to pi-N Charge Exchange Phys. Rev. 166 (1968) 1768–1781.
- D. Horn and R. Silver: Coherent production of pions, Annals Phys. 66 (1971) 509-541
- T. Banks, D. Horn and H. Neuberger: Bosonization of the SU(N) Thirring Models, Nucl. Phys. B108, 119 (1976).
- D. Horn and J. Mandula: Model of Mesons with Constituent Gluons, Phys. Rev. D17, 898 (1978).
- D. Horn, M. Weinstein and S. Yankielowicz: Hamiltonian Approach to Z(N) Lattice Gauge Theories, Phys. Rev. D19, 3715 (1979).
- D. Horn: Finite Matrix Models with Continuous Local Gauge Invariance, Phys. Lett. 100B, 149-151 (1981).
- T. Banks, Y. Dothan and D. Horn: Geometric Fermions, Phys. Lett. 117B, 413 (1982).
- D. Horn and M. Weinstein: The t expansion: A nonperturbative analytic tool for Hamiltonian systems. Phys. Rev. D 30, 1256-1270 (1984).
- Ury Naftaly, Nathan Intrator and David Horn: Optimal Ensemble Averaging of Neural Networks. Network, Computation in Neural Systems, 8, 283-296 (1997).
- David Horn, Nir Levy, Eytan Ruppin: Memory Maintenance via Neuronal Regulation, Neural Computation, 10, 1-18 (1998).
- Asa Ben-Hur, David Horn, Hava Siegelmann and Vladimir Vapnik: Support Vector Clustering. Journal of Machine Learning Research 2, 125-137 (2001).
- David Horn and Assaf Gottlieb: Algorithm for data clustering in pattern recognition problems based on quantum mechanics, Phys. Rev. Lett. 88 (2002) 18702
- Zach Solan, David Horn, Eytan Ruppin and Shimon Edelman: Unsupervised learning of natural languages, Proc. Natl. Acad. Sc. 102 (2005) 11629–11634.
- Vered Kunik, Yasmine Meroz, Zach Solan, Ben Sandbank, Uri Weingart, Eytan Ruppin and David Horn: Functional representation of enzymes by specific peptides. PLOS Computational Biology 2007, 3(8):e167.
- Benny Chor, David Horn, Yaron Levy, Nick Goldman and Tim Massingham: Genomic DNA k-mer spectra: models and modalities. Genome Biology 2009, 10(10):R108
- Erez Persi and David Horn. Systematic Analysis of Compositional Order of Proteins Reveals New Characteristics of Biological Functions and a Universal Correlate of Macroevolution. PLoS Comput Biol 9 (2013): e1003346.
- David Horn. Taxa counting using Specific Peptides of Aminoacyl tRNA Synthetases Encyclopedia of Metagenomics, Springer, 2013.
- Sagi Shporer, Benny Chor, Saharon Rosset, David Horn. Inversion symmetry of DNA k-mer counts: validity and deviations. BMC Genomics 2016, 17:696
- Erez Persi, Davide Prandi, Yuri I. Wolf, Yair Pozniak, Christopher Barbieri, Paola Gasperini, Himisha Beltran, Bishoy M. Faltas, Mark A. Rubin, Tamar Geiger, Eugene V. Koonin, Francesca Demichelis, David Horn. Proteomic and Genomic Signatures of Repeat Instability in Cancer and Adjacent Normal Tissues. PNAS 116, 34, 2019 - 08790

=== Book ===
- David Horn and Fredrick Zachariasen: Hadron Physics at Very High Energies. Benjamin 1973.

=== Patents ===
- Method and Apparatus for Quantum Clustering. USA Patent No. 7,653,646 B2.
- Method for discovering relationships in data by dynamic quantum clustering USA Patent No 8874412 and USA Patent No. 9,646,074.

== Personal life ==
Horn was married to Nira Fuss since 1963 until her death in 2019. He is a father of three, Yuval, Tamar, and Oded, and grandfather of nine. He lives in Tel Aviv, Israel.
