= AND Corporation =

Canadian technology company

AND Corporation is a Canadian technology company that was incorporated in 1992. AND Corporation developed Holographic Neural Technology (HNeT), the technology based upon complex-valued phase coherence/decoherence principles in the emulation of neurological learning and function. The company has been active primarily in the object recognition and biometrics application areas. AND Corporation is based in Toronto, Ontario, Canada.

== Origin ==
In 1992 the Wiley Series on Sixth Generation Computing Technologies published the book Fuzzy, Holographic and Parallel Intelligence, The Sixth Generation Breakthrough which introduces the technology. The author of the article John Sutherland is the founder of AND Corporation. The technology provides holographic superposition of associative information through digital emulation of wave functions. Having recognized the highly advanced learning and storage capacities for associative memory applying these principles, the company received international patents (priority date 1988) for conversion of information to the complex phase representation, and application of complex valued inner and outer products with phase conjugation in the operation of learning and recall. The technology is analogous to quantum computing with respect to superposition of information.

== Products ==
The first version of the HNeT Application Development System was released in 1990 and published in 1991 which contained a number of example applications, based on the complex valued phase coherence/decoherence process. Among these applications were the complex valued Hopfield network or complex associative memory, which was discovered by S. Jankowski in 1996 according to A. Hirose et al. The concepts initially developed and applied within the HNeT technology form the basis for several related academic fields; these referred to by the acronyms Quantum neural network (QNN), Holographic associative memory (HAM), Complex Associative Memory (CAM) and Complex Valued Neural Networks (CVNN).

AND Corporation provides the HNeT Application Development System to government and research institutions on a research basis. The company's primary business activities center on application development and licensing of the HNeT technology. An example of one applied application area of the HNeT technology is in the biometrics (facial recognition) area where the technology has been licensed to Acsys Biometrics. HNeT provides a full Neuromorphic model of the brain, however is applied principally using simpler substructures based on the cerebellar model.
