= QNN =

QNN may refer to:

- Quantum neural network, computational neural network models based on the principles of quantum mechanics
- Quds News Network, a Palestinian youth news agency
