= List of things named after Richard Feynman =

Richard Feynman (1918–1988) was an American theoretical physicist and popular author, who received the Nobel Prize in Physics in 1965 jointly with Julian Schwinger and Shin'ichirō Tomonaga.

== Physics techniques and problems named after Feynman ==
- Bethe–Feynman formula
- Feynman's algorithm
- Feynman–Kac formula
- Feynman–Kleinert Quasi-Classical Wigner method
- Feynman checkerboard
- Feynman diagram
  - Feynman rules
  - One-loop Feynman diagram
- Feynman gauge
- Feynman path integral
- Feynman parametrization
- Feynman propagator
- Feynman slash notation
- Feynman–Smoluchowski ratchet
- Feynman sprinkler
- Heaviside–Feynman formula
- Hellmann–Feynman theorem
- Stückelberg–Feynman interpretation
- Wheeler–Feynman absorber theory

== Other things named after Feynman ==
- 7495 Feynman, asteroid
- Feynmanium, a theoretical chemical element with atomic number Z = 137
- Feynman point (not connected to Feynman)
- Feynman Technique
- Feynman Prize in Nanotechnology
- Feynman (microarchitecture), Nvidia microarchitecture

== See also ==
- Feynman (disambiguation)
