= Optical neural network =

Physical implementation of an artificial neural network with optical components

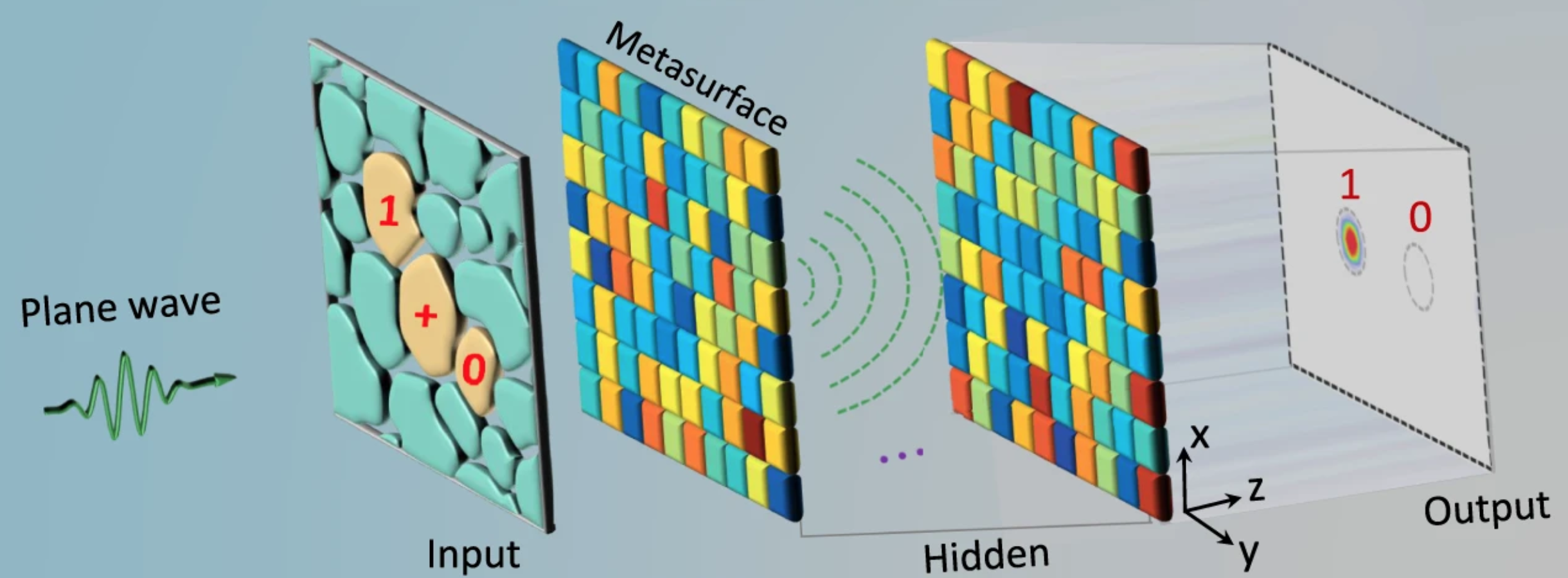
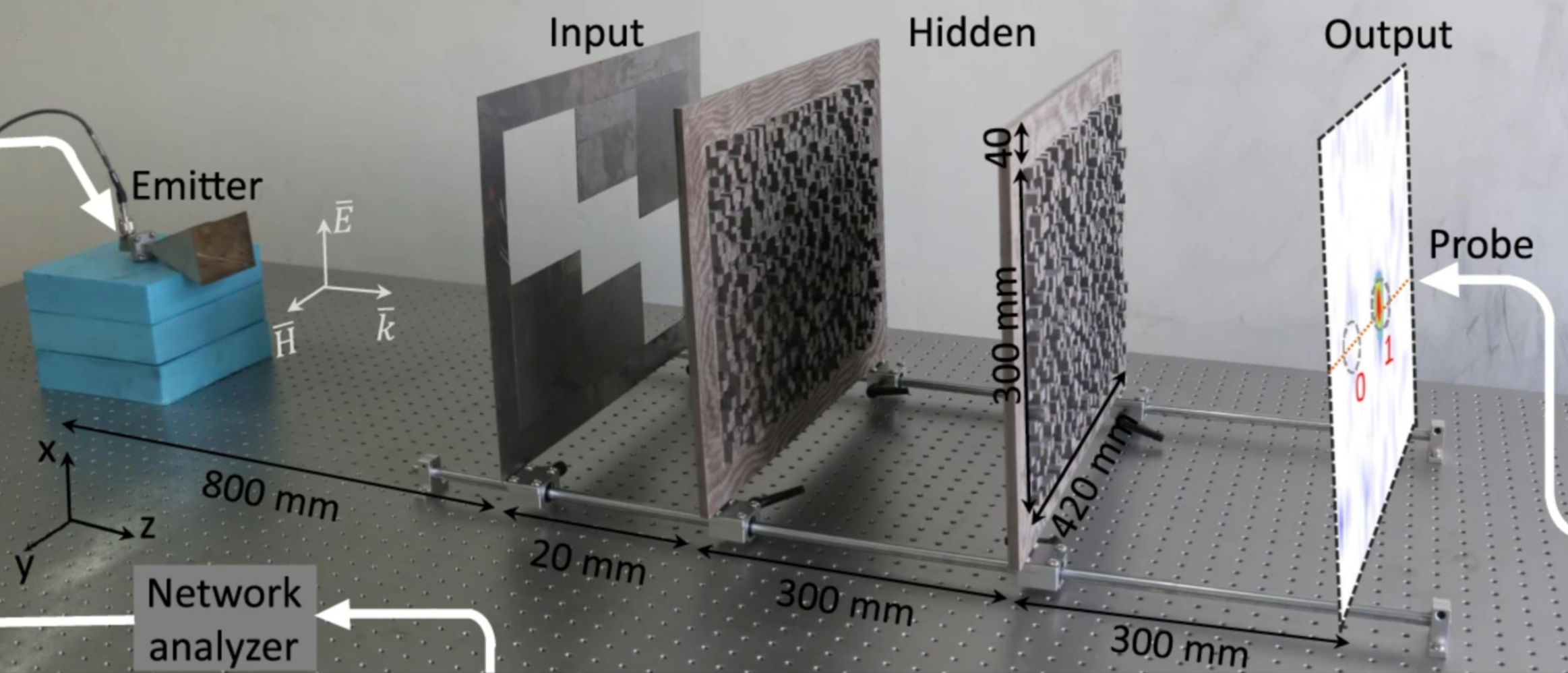
Schematic of an optical neural network that functions as a logic gate (above) and its implementation in microwave frequencies (below). The intermediate diffractive metasurfaces function as hidden layers.

An optical neural network is a physical implementation of an artificial neural network with optical components. Early optical neural networks used a photorefractive Volume hologram to interconnect arrays of input neurons to arrays of output with synaptic weights in proportion to the multiplexed hologram's strength. Volume holograms were further multiplexed using spectral hole burning to add one dimension of wavelength to space to achieve four dimensional interconnects of two dimensional arrays of neural inputs and outputs. This research led to extensive research on alternative methods using the strength of the optical interconnect for implementing neuronal communications.

Some artificial neural networks that have been implemented as optical neural networks include the Hopfield neural network and the Kohonen self-organizing map with liquid crystal spatial light modulators Optical neural networks can also be based on the principles of neuromorphic engineering, creating neuromorphic photonic systems. Typically, these systems encode information in the networks using spikes, mimicking the functionality of spiking neural networks in optical and photonic hardware. Photonic devices that have demonstrated neuromorphic functionalities include (among others) vertical-cavity surface-emitting lasers, integrated photonic modulators, optoelectronic systems based on superconducting Josephson junctions or systems based on resonant tunnelling diodes.

== Electrochemical vs. optical neural networks ==
Biological neural networks function on an electrochemical basis, while optical neural networks use electromagnetic waves. Optical interfaces to biological neural networks can be created with optogenetics, but is not the same as an optical neural networks. In biological neural networks there exist a lot of different mechanisms for dynamically changing the state of the neurons, these include short-term and long-term synaptic plasticity. Synaptic plasticity is among the electrophysiological phenomena used to control the efficiency of synaptic transmission, long-term for learning and memory, and short-term for short transient changes in synaptic transmission efficiency. Implementing this with optical components is difficult, and ideally requires advanced photonic materials. Properties that might be desirable in photonic materials for optical neural networks include the ability to change their efficiency of transmitting light, based on the intensity of incoming light.

== Rising Era of Optical Neural Networks ==
With the increasing significance of computer vision in various domains, the computational cost of these tasks has increased, making it more important to develop the new approaches of the processing acceleration. Optical computing has emerged as a potential alternative to GPU acceleration for modern neural networks, particularly considering the looming obsolescence of Moore's Law. Consequently, optical neural networks have garnered increased attention in the research community. Presently, two primary methods of optical neural computing are under research: silicon photonics-based and free-space optics. Each approach has its benefits and drawbacks; while silicon photonics may offer superior speed, it lacks the massive parallelism that free-space optics can deliver. Given the substantial parallelism capabilities of free-space optics, researchers have focused on taking advantage of it. One implementation, proposed by Lin et al., involves the training and fabrication of phase masks for a handwritten digit classifier. By stacking 3D-printed phase masks, light passing through the fabricated network can be read by a photodetector array of ten detectors, each representing a digit class ranging from 1 to 10. Although this network can achieve terahertz-range classification, it lacks flexibility, as the phase masks are fabricated for a specific task and cannot be retrained. An alternative method for classification in free-space optics, introduced by Cahng et al., employs a 4F system that is based on the convolution theorem to perform convolution operations. This system uses two lenses to execute the Fourier transforms of the convolution operation, enabling passive conversion into the Fourier domain without power consumption or latency. However, the convolution operation kernels in this implementation are also fabricated phase masks, limiting the device's functionality to specific convolutional layers of the network only. In contrast, Li et al. proposed a technique involving kernel tiling to use the parallelism of the 4F system while using a Digital Micromirror Device (DMD) instead of a phase mask. This approach allows users to upload various kernels into the 4F system and execute the entire network's inference on a single device. Unfortunately, modern neural networks are not designed for the 4F systems, as they were primarily developed during the CPU/GPU era. Mostly because they tend to use a lower resolution and a high number of channels in their feature maps.

== Other Implementations ==
In 2007 there was one model of Optical Neural Network: the Programmable Optical Array/Analogic Computer (POAC). It had been implemented in the year 2000 and reported based on modified Joint Fourier Transform Correlator (JTC) and Bacteriorhodopsin (BR) as a holographic optical memory. Full parallelism, large array size and the speed of light are three promises offered by POAC to implement an optical CNN. They had been investigated during the last years with their practical limitations and considerations yielding the design of the first portable POAC version.

The practical details – hardware (optical setups) and software (optical templates) – were published. However, POAC is a general purpose and programmable array computer that has a wide range of applications including:

- image processing
- pattern recognition
- target tracking
- real-time video processing
- document security
- optical switching

== Progress in the 2020s ==
Taichi from Tsinghua University in Beijing is a hybrid ONN that combines the power efficiency and parallelism of optical diffraction and the configurability of optical interference. Taichi offers 13.96 million parameters. Taichi avoids the high error rates that afflict deep (multi-layer) networks by combining clusters of fewer-layer diffractive units with arrays of interferometers for reconfigurable computation. Its encoding protocol divides large network models into sub-models that can be distributed across multiple chiplets in parallel.

Taichi achieved 91.89% accuracy in tests with the Omniglot database. It was also used to generate music Bach and generate images the styles of Van Gogh and Munch.

The developers claimed energy efficiency of up to 160 trillion operations second^{−1} watt^{−1} and an area efficiency of 880 trillion multiply-accumulate operations mm^{−2} or 10^{3} more energy efficient than the NVIDIA H100, and 10^{2} times more energy efficient and 10 times more area efficient than previous ONNs.

Time dimension has recently been introduced into diffractive neural network by fs laser lithography of perovskite hydration. The temporal behaviour of the neuron can be modulated by the fs laser at the nanoscale, enabling a programmable holographic neural network with temporal evolution functionality, i.e., the functionality can change with time under the hydration stimuli. An in-memory temporal inference functionality was demonstrated to mimic the function evolution of the human brain, i.e., the functionality can change from simple digit image classification to more complicated digit and clothing product image classification with time. This is the first time of introducing time dimension into the optical neural network, laying a foundation for future brain-like photonic chip development.

== See also ==
- Optical computing
- Quantum neural network
