= Feynman's algorithm =

Feynman's algorithm is an algorithm that is used to simulate the operations of a quantum computer on a classical computer. It is based on the Path integral formulation of quantum mechanics, which was formulated by Richard Feynman.

== Overview ==
An $n$ qubit quantum computer takes in a quantum circuit $U$ that contains $m$ gates and an input state $|0\rangle^n$. It then outputs a string of bits $x \in \{0, 1\} ^n$ with probability $P(x_{m}) = |\langle x_{m}|U|0\rangle^n|^2$.

In Schrödinger's algorithm, $P(x_{m})$ is calculated straightforwardly via matrix multiplication. That is, $P(x_{m}) = |\langle x_{m}|U_{m} U_{m-1} U_{m-2} U_{m-3}, ..., U_{1}|0\rangle^n|^2$. The quantum state of the system can be tracked throughout its evolution.

In Feynman's path algorithm, $P(x_{m})$ is calculated by summing up the contributions of $(2^{n})^{m-1}$ histories. That is,
$$P(x_{m}) = |\langle x_{m}|U|0\rangle^n|^2 = \left|\sum_{x_{1}, x_{2}, x_{3}, ... ,x_{m-1} \in \{0, 1\}^n}  \prod_{j=1}^{m} \langle x_j|U_{j}|x_{j-1}\rangle\right|^2$$.

Schrödinger's takes less time to run compared to Feynman's while Feynman's takes more time and less space. More precisely, Schrödinger's takes $\sim m 2^{n}$ time and $\sim 2^{n}$ space while Feynman's takes $\sim 4^{m}$ time and $\sim m+n$ space.

== Example ==
Consider the problem of creating a Bell state. What is the probability that the resulting measurement will be $00$?

Since the quantum circuit that generates a Bell state is the H (Hadamard gate) gate followed by the CNOT gate, the unitary for this circuit is $(H \otimes I) \times CNOT$. In that case, $P(00) = |\langle 00|(H \otimes I) \times \mathrm{CNOT}|00\rangle|^2 = \frac{1}{2}$ using Schrödinger's algorithm. So probability resulting measurement will be $00$ is $\frac{1}{2}$.

Using Feynman's algorithm, the Bell state circuit contains $(2^{2})^{2-1} = 4$ histories: $00, 01, 10, 11$ . So
$$\begin{align}
\left|\sum_{00, 01, 10, 11} \prod_{j=1}^{2} \langle x_j|U_{j}|x_{j-1}\rangle\right|^2
&= \Big| \langle 00| H \otimes I|00\rangle \times \langle 00| \mathrm{CNOT}|00\rangle \\
&\quad + \langle 01| H \otimes I|00\rangle \times \langle 00| \mathrm{CNOT}|01\rangle \\
&\quad + \langle 10| H \otimes I|00\rangle \times \langle 00| \mathrm{CNOT}|10\rangle \\
&\quad + \langle 11| H \otimes I|00\rangle \times \langle 00| \mathrm{CNOT}|11\rangle \Big|^2 \\
&= \left|\frac{1}{\sqrt{2}} + 0 + 0 + 0\right|^2 \\
&= \frac{1}{2}
\end{align}$$

== See also ==
- Hamiltonian simulation
- Quantum simulation
