= Ewin Tang =

American computer scientist (born 2000)

- Born: 2000 (age 25–26)
- Education: University of Texas at Austin (BS); University of Washington (PhD)
- Awards: Maryam Mirzakhani New Frontiers Prize (2025)
- Scientific career
- Fields: Theoretical computer science Quantum computing
- Doctoral advisor: James Lee
- Other academic advisors: Scott Aaronson
- Website: ewintang.com

Ewin Tang (born 2000) is a computer scientist at the University of California, Berkeley. She was named as one of 2019 Science Forbes 30 Under 30 for her work developing classical algorithms which matched the performance of the fastest known quantum algorithms, done as an undergraduate under the supervision of Scott Aaronson.

== Early life and education ==
Tang skipped the fourth, fifth, and sixth grades to take courses at a local high school and at the University of Texas at Arlington at the age of 10, and then enrolled at the University of Texas at Austin at the age of 14.

Tang first began research working with her mother, Wen-Jing Hu, in the nanotechnology laboratory of her father, Liping Tang. Together they worked on in vivo imaging for biomedical research such as optical probes to view polarized macrophages during foreign body reactions, bacterial infection, fibrin deposition, and real-time detection of neutrophil responses. In 2014 Tang was awarded an honorable mention for the Davidson Fellowship.

In 2017 Tang took a class on quantum computing from Scott Aaronson, who recognized her as an "unusually talented student" and became her undergraduate thesis advisor. Tang eventually developed a new classical algorithm for a matrix completion problem, motivated by applications to recommendation systems. The algorithm became the basis of her undergraduate thesis A quantum-inspired classical algorithm for recommendation systems and she received a BS in computer science and pure mathematics from UT Austin in 2018.

In 2018 Tang was named as a University of Texas at Austin Dean's Honored Graduate in computer science, having maintained a 4.0 grade-point average.

In 2023 Tang completed her Ph.D. in theoretical computer science at the University of Washington under the supervision of James Lee, where she continued her undergraduate work on quantum-inspired classical algorithms for other problems, such as principal component analysis and low-rank stochastic regression.

== Research ==
Before Tang's undergraduate thesis, the best known classical algorithms for matrix completion were exponentially slower than the best quantum algorithms, under certain assumptions. Inspired by the quantum algorithms, she found "dequantized" classical algorithms solving matrix completion in similar time as the quantum algorithms and under similar assumptions, exponentially improving over the best known classical algorithms.

The best known quantum algorithm for matrix completion runs in polylogarithmic time by using the HHL algorithm as a subroutine, and had been introduced in 2016 by Iordanis Kerenidis and Anupam Prakash. Tang's algorithm runs in polylogarithmic time by using a classical analog of quantum sampling techniques. Prior to Tang's results, it was widely assumed that no fast classical algorithm existed; Kerenidis and Prakash did not attempt to study the classical solution, and Aaronson tasked Tang with proving its nonexistence. Before the results were made public, Tang presented a preliminary version of the algorithm at a quantum computing workshop in June 2018 at the University of California, where the audience included Aaronson, Kerenidis, and Prakash. After four hours of questioning, the consensus was that Tang's classical algorithm seemed correct. Tang published her results in STOC in June 2019, and in Physical Review Letters in August 2021.

== Recognition ==
There was wide media coverage in response to Tang's work on the recommendation problem, which was perceived as eliminating one of the best examples of quantum speedup. Some researchers defended quantum computing approaches, such as Robert Young, director of the Quantum Technology Centre at Lancaster University, who said "If we hadn't invested in quantum computing, the quantum algorithm that inspired [Ms] Tang wouldn't have existed." Tang herself noted the divisive nature of comparing classical to quantum algorithms, and the trepidation of proving her algorithm to her advisor, "I started believing there is a fast classical algorithm, but I couldn’t really prove it to myself because Scott [Aaronson] seemed to think there wasn’t one, and he was the authority."

In 2019, Tang was named as one of Forbes 30 Under 30 for developing a computing method "allowing regular computers to solve a particular problem as quickly as a quantum computer."

In 2025, Tang received a Maryam Mirzakhani New Frontiers Prize for "developing classical analogs of quantum algorithms for machine learning and linear algebra, and for advances in quantum machine learning on quantum data."

== Personal life ==
Tang's father is Liping Tang, a bioengineering professor at UT Arlington and CTO at Progenitec, a biotechnology startup. Her mother is Wen-Jing Hu, the founder and CEO of Progenitec.

Tang is left-handed.
