= Quantum image =

Quantum computation, which exploits quantum parallelism, is in principle faster than a classical computer for certain problems. Quantum image is encoding the image information in quantum-mechanical systems instead of classical ones and replacing classical with quantum information processing may alleviate some of these challenges.

Humans obtain most of their information through their eyes. Accordingly, the analysis of visual data is one of the most important functions of our brain and it has evolved high efficiency in processing visual data. Currently, visual information like images and videos constitutes the largest part of data traffic in the internet. Processing of this information requires ever-larger computational power.

The laws of quantum mechanics allow one to reduce the required resources for some tasks by many orders of magnitude if the image data are encoded in the quantum state of a suitable physical system. The researchers discuss a suitable method for encoding image data, and develop a new quantum algorithm that can detect boundaries among parts of an image with a single logical operation. This edge-detection operation is independent of the size of the image. Several other algorithms are also discussed. It is theoretically and experimentally demonstrated that they work in practice. This is the first experiment to demonstrate practical quantum image processing. It contributes a substantial progress towards both theoretical and experimental quantum computing for image processing, it will stimulate future studies in the field of quantum information processing of visual data.

== See also ==
- Quantum computing
- Quantum image processing
