= Quantum Theory: Concepts and Methods =

1993 physics textbook by Asher Peres

- Author: Asher Peres
- Language: English
- Subject: Quantum mechanics
- Publisher: Kluwer Academic Publishers
- Publication date: 1993

Quantum Theory: Concepts and Methods is a 1993 quantum physics textbook by Israeli physicist Asher Peres. Well-regarded among the physics community, it is known for unconventional choices of topics to include.

== Contents ==
In his preface, Peres summarized his goals as follows:

The purpose of this book is to clarify the conceptual meaning of quantum theory, and to explain some of the mathematical methods that it utilizes. This text is not concerned with specialized topics such as atomic structure, or strong or weak interactions, but with the very foundations of the theory. This is not, however, a book on the philosophy of science. The approach is pragmatic and strictly instrumentalist. This attitude will undoubtedly antagonize some readers, but it has its own logic: quantum phenomena do not occur in a Hilbert space, they occur in a laboratory. (Note: Preface, p. xi. The last remark is often quoted, for example by Brukner and Zeilinger and by Czartowski and Życzkowski.)

The book is divided into three parts. The first, "Gathering the Tools", introduces quantum mechanics as a theory of "preparations" and "tests", and it develops the mathematical formalism of Hilbert spaces, concluding with the spectral theory used to understand the quantum mechanics of continuous-valued observables. Part II, "Cryptodeterminism and Quantum Inseparability", focuses on Bell's theorem and other demonstrations that quantum mechanics is incompatible with local hidden-variable theories. (Within its substantial discussion of the failure of hidden variable theories, the book includes a FORTRAN program for testing whether a list of vectors forms a Kochen–Specker configuration. (Note: Section 7-5, "Appendix: Computer test for Kochen–Specker contradiction", p. 209)) Part III, "Quantum Dynamics and Information", covers the role of spacetime symmetry in quantum physics, the relation of quantum information to thermodynamics, semiclassical approximation methods, quantum chaos, and the treatment of measurement in quantum mechanics.

To generate the figures in his chapter on quantum chaos, including plots in phase space of chaotic motion, Peres wrote PostScript code that executed simulations in the printer itself. (Note: Section 11-7, "Appendix: PostScript code for a map", p. 370)

The book develops the methodology of mathematically representing quantum measurements by POVMs, and it provided the first pedagogical treatment of how to use a POVM for quantum key distribution. Peres downplayed the importance of the uncertainty principle; that specific term only appears once in his index, and its entry points to that same page in the index. The text itself does discuss the uncertainty principle, pointing out how an oversimplified "derivation" of it breaks down, and posing as a homework problem the task of finding three quantum-physics textbooks with a demonstrably incorrect uncertainty relation.

== Reception ==
Physicist Leslie E. Ballentine gave the textbook a positive review, declaring it a good introduction to quantum foundations and ongoing research therein. John C. Baez also gave the book a positive assessment, calling it "clear-headed" and finding that it contained "a lot of gems that I hadn't seen", such as the Wigner–Araki–Yanase theorem. Michael Nielsen wrote of the textbook, "Revelation! Suddenly, all the key results of 30 years of work (several of those results due to Asher) were distilled into beautiful and simple explanations." Nielsen and Isaac Chuang said in their own influential textbook that Peres' was "superb", providing "an extremely clear exposition of elementary quantum mechanics" as well as an "extensive discussion of the Bell inequalities and related results". Jochen Rau's introductory textbook on quantum physics described Peres' work as "an excellent place to start" learning about Bell inequalities and related topics like Gleason's theorem.

N. David Mermin wrote that Peres had bridged the "textual gap" between conceptually-oriented books, aimed at understanding what quantum physics implies about the nature of the world, and more practical books intended to teach how to apply quantum mechanics. Mermin found the book praiseworthy, noting that he had "only a few complaints". He wrote:

Peres is careless in discriminating among the various kinds of assumptions one needs to prove the impossibility of a no-hidden-variables theory that reproduces the statistical predictions of quantum mechanics. I would guess that this is because even though he is a master practitioner of this particular art form, deep in his heart he is so firmly convinced that hidden variables cannot capture the essence of quantum mechanics, that he is simply not interested in precisely what you need to assume to prove that they cannot.

Mermin called the book "a treasure trove of novel perspectives on quantum mechanics" and said that Peres' choice of topics is "a catalogue of common omissions" from other approaches.

Meinhard E. Mayer declared that he would "recommend it to anyone teaching or studying quantum mechanics", finding Part II the most interesting of the book. While he noted some disappointment with Peres' selection of topics to include in the chapter on measurement, he reserved most of his negativity for the publisher, saying (as Ballentine also did) that they had priced the book beyond the reach of graduate students:

Such pricing practices are not justified when one considers that many publishers provide very little copyediting or typesetting any more, as is obvious from the "TeX"-ish look of most books published recently, this one included.

Mermin, Mayer and Baez noted that Peres briefly dismissed the many-worlds interpretation of quantum mechanics. Peres argued that all varieties of many-worlds interpretations merely shifted the arbitrariness or vagueness of the wavefunction collapse idea to the question of when "worlds" can be regarded as separate, and that no objective criterion for that separation can actually be formulated. (Note: Section 12-1, "The ambivalent observer", p. 374) Moreover, Peres dismissed "spontaneous collapse" models like Ghirardi–Rimini–Weber theory in the same brief section, designating them "mutations" of quantum mechanics. In a review that praised the book's thoroughness, Tony Sudbery noted that Peres disparaged the idea that human consciousness plays a special role in quantum mechanics.

Manuel Bächtold analyzed Peres' textbook from a standpoint of philosophical pragmatism. John Conway and Simon Kochen used a Kochen–Specker configuration from the book in order to prove their free will theorem. Peres' insistence in his textbook that the classical analogue of a quantum state is a Liouville density function was influential in the development of QBism.

== Related works ==
John Watrous places Peres' textbook among the "indispensable references", along with Nielsen and Chuang's Quantum Computation and Quantum Information and Mark Wilde's Quantum Information Theory. In their obituary for Peres, William Wootters, Charles Bennett and coauthors call Quantum Theory: Concepts and Methods the "modern successor" to John von Neumann's 1955 Mathematical Foundations of Quantum Mechanics.

== Editions ==
- Peres, Asher (1993). Quantum Theory: Concepts and Methods. Kluwer. ISBN 0-7923-2549-4. OCLC 28854083. Original hardcover.
- Peres, Asher (1995). Quantum Theory: Concepts and Methods. Kluwer. ISBN 9780792336327. OCLC 901395752. Paperback reprint.
- Peres, Asher (2001). ペレス量子論の概念と手法―先端研究へのアプローチ (in Japanese). Translated by Ōba, Ichirō; Yamanaka, Yoshiya; Nakazato, Hiromichi. Maruzen. ISBN 9784621049228. OCLC 834645102.
