= Quantum theory =

Quantum theory may refer to:

== Science ==
- Quantum mechanics, a major field of physics
- Old quantum theory, predating modern quantum mechanics
- Quantum field theory, an area of quantum mechanics that includes:
  - Quantum electrodynamics
  - Quantum chromodynamics
  - Electroweak interaction
- Quantum gravity, a field of theoretical physics
- Quantum optics
- Quantum chemistry
- Quantum information
- Quantum Theory: Concepts and Methods, a 1993 book by Asher Peres

== Arts and other media ==
- Quantum Theory (video game), a 2010 video game
- "Quantum Theory", a song on the Jarvis Cocker album Jarvis
