= Code Words =

Online computer programming publication

Code Words is an online publication about computer programming produced by the Recurse Center retreat community. It began publishing in December 2014, and has a quarterly schedule.

The journal features original work by participants at the center, including visiting “residents” and alumni. It is intended to “share the joyful approach to programming and learning that typifies” the community, and to be “accessible and useful to both new and seasoned programmers.”

Topics commonly treated include the inner workings of programming tools such as Git; Computer Science concepts such as propositional logic, data types, and random forests; and treatments of diverse problems encountered in actual programming.

The supervising editor is Rachel Honor Vincent, with individual articles co-edited by members of the community. Contributions are licensed under the Creative Commons CC BY-NC-SA 4.0 license.
