= Nielsen's theorem =

Nielsen's theorem is a result in quantum information concerning transformations between bipartite states due to Michael Nielsen. It makes use of majorization.

== Statement ==
A bipartite state $|\psi\rangle$ transforms to another $| \phi \rangle$ using local operations and classical communication if and only if $\lambda_{\psi}$ is majorized by $\lambda_{\phi}$ where the $\lambda_i$ are the Schmidt coefficients of the respective state.

This can be written more concisely as

$|\psi \rangle \rightarrow |\phi\rangle$ iff $\lambda_{\psi} \prec \lambda_{\phi}$.

== Proof ==
The proof is detailed in the paper and will be added here at a later date.
