= Recurse Center =

Computer programming institution

The Recurse Center
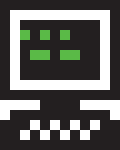
- Website type: Intentional community
- Headquarters: New York, New York
- Owners: 5blades, Inc.
- Founders: David Albert, Nick Bergson-Shilcock, Sonali Sridhar
- Website: recurse.com
- Commercial: yes
- Registration: No charge, competitive admission
- Launched: July 18, 2011; 15 years ago

The Recurse Center (formerly known as Hacker School; also called RC) is an independent educational institution, that combines a retreat for computer programmers with a recruiting agency. The retreat is an intentional community, a self-directed academic environment for programmers of all levels to improve their skills in, without charge. There is no curriculum and no particular programming languages or paradigms are institutionally favored; instead, participants work on open-source projects of their own choice, alone or collaboratively, as they see best. Since 2012, the Center has run grants and fellowship programmes aimed at increasing participation of women and other underrepresented groups in its batches. After switching to online programming in 2020, the Recurse Center reopened its physical space in 2023.

== History ==
The Center was initially founded in the Summer of 2010 as Hackruiter, an engineering recruiting company, using seed money from Y Combinator. The idea quickly arose of trying to transform recruiting for start-ups by running a retreat as part of the process, with the goal of improving participants' programming skills.

It officially opened its doors as “Hacker School” in New York in July, 2011. Hacker School came to wide public attention in mid-2012, when it partnered with the e-commerce company Etsy to offer “Hacker Grants” in support of female developers. A number of companies soon joined Etsy in funding these grants, and in 2014 the grant program expanded to offer support to other groups not well represented in American technology industries.

In 2015 Hacker School was renamed the Recurse Center.

== Business model ==
The programming retreat is free of charge for admitted applicants to attend. The organization itself is for-profit and supports itself through recruitment, by placing some participants in programming jobs. It has had recruiting partnerships with Airtable, Notion, Hudson River Trading, Jane Street, OpenAI, and more. In 2014 the retreat reached the "tipping point" of self-sufficiency purely from recruiting income.

Internal costs to the company have been reported at "nearly $12,000" for each participant.

The Center does not publish statistics on its admission rate, although there is no published rule against reapplication.

== Educational philosophy and name ==
There is no curriculum; each participant imposes their own structure for self-directed learning on their stay at the Recurse Center, with guidance as requested. Despite its original name ”Hacker School“, the Recurse Center is not a school — its model of self-directed learning was inspired by the Unschooling philosophy of John Holt (1923–1985). Nor does it have any connection to the popular notion of a hacker as someone who breaks into computer systems — rather, “hacker” here was intended to suggest a programmer who is technically resourceful but also supportive of other programmers.

In 2015 the organization changed its name to the Recurse Center to avoid confusion over these matters.

Since its founding, the faculty have experimented continually with day-to-day experience in the retreat. Experiments have included:

- “facilitators” for day-to-day shepherding of participants and improvement of the organization itself,
- a "residents" program for shorter-term specialist guidance,
- Code Words, a journal about programming,
- a “maintainers” program to promote contribution to open-source software projects
- a research lab,
- retreat duration variations including 3 months and 6 weeks ("half-length batches"), and
- a mentoring program for new coders.

== Social environment and influence ==
The Center did not initially publish a code of conduct, but eventually formalized its expectations of participant behavior in June 2017. Prior to that, it listed social rules intended to shepherd community behavior and “to remove as many distractions as possible so everyone can focus on programming.”

These social rules are one of the retreat's most influential features and have been adopted by a number of other programming communities. Additionally, there is a large community of alumni that have remained active past the end of their career, interacting with each other and with new participants in person or via virtual tools.

== Specializations of participants ==
The level of participants' skill and experience is diverse, in common with retreats in other creative fields and unlike many engineering organizations. Participants range from long-experienced software developers on sabbatical, to people who have been coding for only a few months, to retirees, to college students on vacation. Some participants hold doctoral degrees; others have left school before completing secondary or even primary education. Many participants are engineers, but others have strong non-engineering backgrounds, in the humanities, journalism, pure mathematics, the performing arts, among many others.

== Notable alumni ==
- Timnit Gebru (Summer 2012), AI ethics researcher
- Michael Nielsen (Summer 2012), quantum physicist
- Greg Brockman (Summer 2 2015), co-founder of OpenAI
- Raph Levien (Fall 1 2017), creator of Advogato
- Paul Biggar (Fall 1 2016), co-founder of CircleCI
- Andrew Kelley (Spring 1 2017), creator of Zig
- Martin Kleppmann (resident, Fall 2015), author of Designing Data-Intensive Applications
