= Eleanor Rieffel =

American mathematician

Eleanor Gilbert Rieffel (born 1965) is a mathematician interested in quantum computing, computer vision, and cryptography. She is a senior research scientist at NASA's Ames Research Center.

Rieffel earned her Ph.D. in 1993 from the University of California, Los Angeles. Her dissertation, Groups Coarse Quasi-Isometric to the Hyperbolic Plane Cross the Real Line, concerned geometric group theory, and was supervised by Geoffrey Mess. After working for FX Palo Alto Laboratory, she joined NASA in 2012. In 2019 she won the NASA Exceptional Engineering Achievement Medal.

With Wolfgang Polak, Rieffel is the author of the book Quantum Computing: A Gentle Introduction (MIT Press, 2011).
