= Peres metric =

Metric in relativity

In mathematical physics, the Peres metric is defined by the proper time

$${d \tau}^{2} = dt^2 - 2f(t+z, x, y) (dt+dz)^2-dx^2-dy^2-dz^2$$

for any arbitrary function f. If f is a harmonic function with respect to x and y, then the corresponding Peres metric satisfies the Einstein field equations in vacuum. Such a metric is often studied in the context of gravitational waves.

The metric is named for Israeli physicist Asher Peres, who first defined it in 1959.

== See also ==
- Introduction to the mathematics of general relativity
- Stress–energy tensor
- Metric tensor (general relativity)
