= Isaac Chuang =

American electrical engineer and physicist

Isaac L. Chuang
- Education: Stanford University; MIT
- Known for: NMR quantum computing Quantum Computation and Quantum Information
- Awards: American Physical Society Fellow (2010); MIT Technology Review TR100 (1999)
- Scientific career
- Fields: Electrical engineering, Physics
- Workplaces: MIT; IBM; University of California Berkeley; Los Alamos National Laboratory
- Doctoral advisor: Yoshihisa Yamamoto
- Doctoral students: Aram Harrow
- Website: http://feynman.mit.edu/ike/homepage/index.html

Isaac L. Chuang is an American electrical engineer and physicist. He is a professor of electrical engineering at the Massachusetts Institute of Technology (MIT). He received his undergraduate degrees in physics (1990) and electrical engineering (1991) and master's in electrical engineering (1991) at MIT. In 1997 he received his PhD in electrical engineering from Stanford University.

Chuang is one of the pioneers of NMR quantum computing. He later began working on trapped ion quantum computing, after liquid state NMR quantum computing fell out of favor because of excessive noise limiting its scalability to only tens of qubits.

In 2008, Chuang was the principal investigator of a doctoral-study program in quantum information science. As part of it, MIT was awarded a $3 million grant from the National Science Foundation for a new graduate training program.

Chuang is known, along with Michael Nielsen, for having authored Quantum Computation and Quantum Information, one of the primary reference books in quantum computing.

While employed at IBM in 1999, Chuang was to be featured in a film by Errol Morris, commissioned by IBM for an internal conference on the occasion of the year 2000. The conference was cancelled and the film was never completed, but Morris's personal website contains excerpts including Chuang.

In 2015, he led a study showing that some students on the edX platform cheat by creating multiple accounts and "harvesting" correct answers.

== Honors ==
- 2010 Fellow of the American Physical Society
- In 1999, he was named to the MIT Technology Review TR100 as one of the top 100 innovators in the world under the age of 35.

== Selected bibliography ==
- Nielsen, Michael A.; Chuang, Isaac L. (2000). Quantum Computation and Quantum Information (10th Anniversary ed.). Cambridge, UK: Cambridge University Press. ISBN 978-0-521-63235-5. OCLC 43641333.
