= Michael Nielsen =

Australian and Canadian physicist and writer (b.1974)

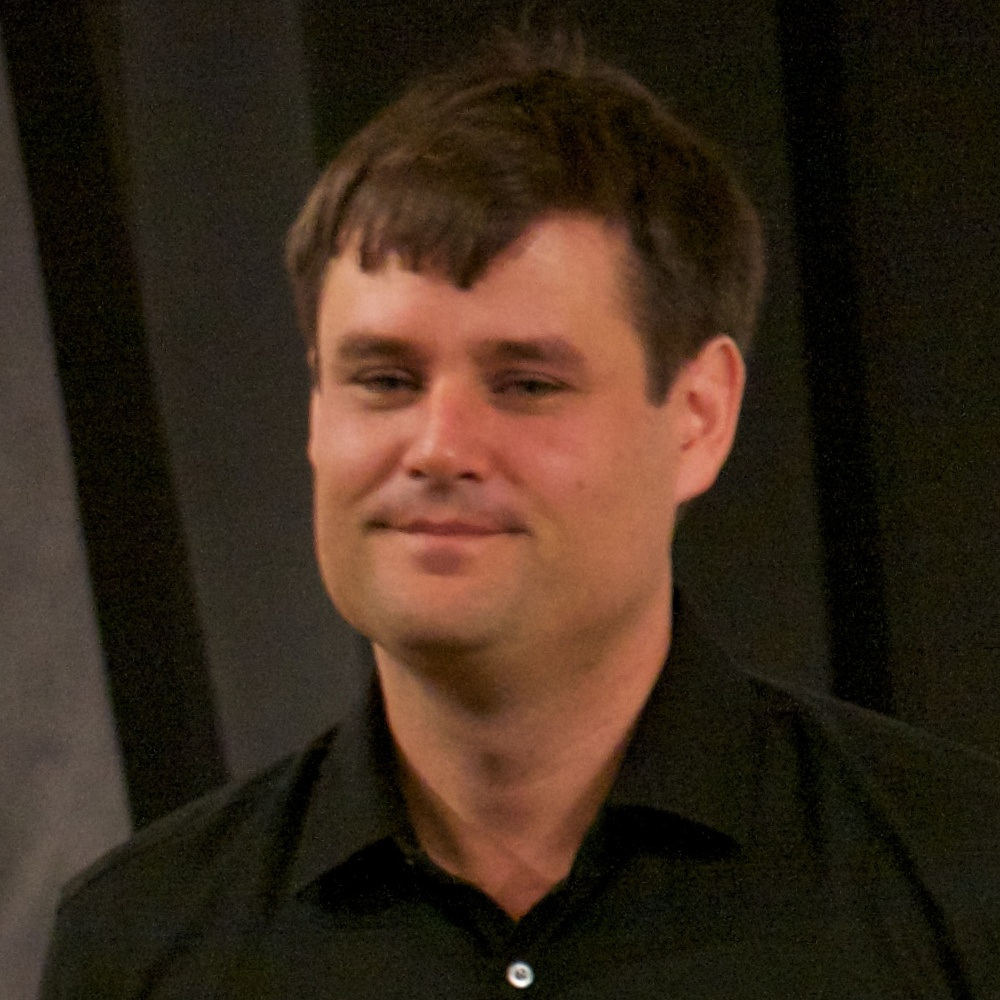
- Michael Nielsen at Science Online London 2011
- Born: Michael Aaron Nielsen; January 4, 1974 (age 52)
- Education: University of New Mexico; University of Queensland
- Known for: Quantum Computation and Quantum Information; Nielsen's theorem
- Awards: Richard C. Tolman Prize Fellow at Caltech, Fulbright Scholar
- Scientific career
- Fields: Physics, Computer science
- Workplaces: Los Alamos National Laboratory; Caltech; University of Queensland; Perimeter Institute; Recurse Center
- Thesis: Quantum Information Theory (1998)
- Doctoral advisor: Carlton M. Caves
- Website: https://michaelnotebook.com

Michael Aaron Nielsen (born January 4, 1974) is an Australian-American quantum physicist, science writer, and computer programming researcher living in San Francisco.

== Work ==
In 1998, Nielsen received his PhD in physics from the University of New Mexico. In 2004, he was recognized as Australia's "youngest academic" and was awarded a Federation Fellowship at the University of Queensland. During this fellowship, he worked at the Los Alamos National Laboratory, Caltech, and at the Perimeter Institute for Theoretical Physics.

Alongside Isaac Chuang, Nielsen co-authored a popular textbook on quantum computing, which has been cited more than 52,000 times as of July 2023.

In 2007, Nielsen shifted his focus from quantum information and computation to “the development of new tools for scientific collaboration and publication”, including the Polymath project with Timothy Gowers, which aims to facilitate "massively collaborative mathematics." Besides writing books and essays, he has also given talks about open science. He was a member of the Working Group on Open Data in Science at the Open Knowledge Foundation.

Nielsen is a strong advocate for open science and has written extensively on the subject, including in his book Reinventing Discovery, which was favorably reviewed in Nature and named one of the Financial Times' best books of 2011.

In 2015 Nielsen published the online textbook Neural Networks and Deep Learning, and joined the Recurse Center as a Research Fellow for a year. He then joined Y Combinator Research as a Research Fellow from 2016 to 2019.

In 2019, Nielsen collaborated with Andy Matuschak to develop Quantum Computing for the Very Curious, a series of interactive essays explaining quantum computing and quantum mechanics. With Patrick Collison, he researched whether scientific progress is slowing down.

Nielsen resides in San Francisco.

== Bibliography ==
- Nielsen, Michael A.; Chuang, Isaac L. (2010), Quantum Computation and Quantum Information (New ed., 10th anniversary ed.), Cambridge University Press, ISBN 978-1-107-00217-3
- Nielsen, Michael A. (2011). Reinventing Discovery: The New Era of Networked Science. Princeton, N.J: Princeton University Press. ISBN 978-0-691-14890-8. This book is based on themes that are also covered in his essay on the Future of Science.
- Nielsen, Michael A. (2015). Neural Networks and Deep Learning. Determination Press.
- Nielsen, M. A. (2004). "The bits that make up the Universe". Nature. 427 (6969): 16–17. Bibcode:2004Natur.427...16N. doi:10.1038/427016b. (Review of Information: The New Language of Science (2003) by Hans Christian von Baeyer)
