= James Gibbs (disambiguation) =

James Gibbs (1682–1754) was a British architect.

James Gibbs may also refer to:

- James A. Gibbs (1922–2010), author, lighthouse keeper, and maritime historian
- James Cross Gibbs (1845–1927), founder of Gibbs family (bakers) in Adelaide, South Australia
- James Edward Allen Gibbs (1829–1902), farmer, inventor, and businessman in Virginia
- Jim Gibbs (1909–1996), rugby player
- James Gibbs (physician) (died 1724), English physician and poet
- James Edmund Gibbs (1928–), inventor of the dyadic derivative

== See also ==
- Gibbs (surname)
- James Gibb (disambiguation)
