= Hidden linear function problem =

Search problem in quantum mechanics

The hidden linear function problem, is a search problem that generalizes the Bernstein–Vazirani problem. In the Bernstein–Vazirani problem, the hidden function is implicitly specified in an oracle; while in the 2D hidden linear function problem (2D HLF), the hidden function is explicitly specified by a matrix and a binary vector. 2D HLF can be solved exactly by a constant-depth quantum circuit restricted to a 2-dimensional grid of qubits using bounded fan-in gates but can't be solved by any sub-exponential size, constant-depth classical circuit using unbounded fan-in biased threshold gates. While Bernstein–Vazirani's problem was designed to prove an oracle separation between complexity classes BQP and BPP, 2D HLF was designed to prove an explicit separation between the circuit classes $QNC^{0}$ and $NC^{0}$ ($QNC^{0} \nsubseteq NC^{0}$).

== 2D HLF problem statement ==
Given $A \in \mathbb{F}_2^{n \times n}$(an upper- triangular binary matrix of size $n \times n$) and $b \in \mathbb{F}_2^n$ (a binary vector of length $n$),

define a function $q : \mathbb{F}_2^n \to \mathbb{Z}_4$:

$$q(x) = (2 x^T A x + b^T x) \bmod 4 = \left(2 \sum_{i,j}A_{i,j} x_i x_j + \sum_i b_i x_i \right) \bmod 4 ,$$

and

$$\mathcal{L}_q = \Big\{x \in  \mathbb{F}_2^n : q(x \oplus y) = (q(x) + q(y)) \bmod 4 ~~ \forall y \in \mathbb{F}_2^n \Big\}.$$

There exists a $z \in \mathbb{F}_2^n$ such that

$$q(x) = 2 z^T x ~~\forall x \in \mathcal{L}_q.$$

Find $z$.

== 2D HLF algorithm ==
With 3 registers; the first holding $A$, the second containing $b$ and the third carrying an $n$-qubit state, the circuit has controlled gates which implement $U_q = \prod_{1 < i < j < n} CZ_{ij}^{A_{ij}} \cdot \bigotimes_{j=1}^n S_j^{b_j}$ from the first two registers to the third.

This problem can be solved by a quantum circuit, $H^{\otimes n} U_q H^{\otimes n} \mid 0^n \rangle$, where H is the Hadamard gate, S is the S gate and CZ is CZ gate. It is solved by this circuit because with $p(z) = \left| \langle z | H^{\otimes n} U_q H ^ {\otimes n} | 0^n \rangle \right|^2$, $p(z)>0$ iff $z$ is a solution.
