= Fourier transform on finite groups =

Generalization of the discrete Fourier transform

In mathematics, the Fourier transform on finite groups is a generalization of the discrete Fourier transform from cyclic to arbitrary finite groups.

== Definitions ==
The Fourier transform of a function $f : G \to \Complex$ at a representation $\varrho : G \to \mathrm{GL}_{d_\varrho}(\Complex)$ of $G$ is

$$\widehat{f}(\varrho) = \sum_{a \in G} f(a) \varrho(a).$$

For each representation $\varrho$ of $G$, $\widehat{f}(\varrho)$ is a $d_\varrho \times d_\varrho$ matrix, where $d_\varrho$ is the degree of $\varrho$.

Let $\widehat{G}$ be the complete set of inequivalent irreducible representations of $G$. Then the inverse Fourier transform at an element $a$ of $G$ is given by

$$f(a) = \frac{1}{|G|} \sum_{\varrho \in \widehat{G}} d_{\varrho} \mathrm{Tr}\left(\varrho(a^{-1})\widehat{f}(\varrho)\right).$$

== Properties ==
=== Transform of a convolution ===
The convolution of two functions $f, g : G \to \mathbb{C}$ is defined as

$$(f \ast g)(a) = \sum_{b \in G} f\!\left(ab^{-1}\right) g(b).$$

The Fourier transform of a convolution at any representation $\varrho$ of $G$ is given by

$$\widehat{f \ast g}(\varrho) = \hat{f}(\varrho)\hat{g}(\varrho).$$

=== Plancherel formula ===
For functions $f, g : G \to \mathbb{C}$, the Plancherel formula states

$$\sum_{a \in G} f(a^{-1}) g(a) = \frac{1}{|G|} \sum_i d_{\varrho_i} \text{Tr}\left(\hat{f}(\varrho_i)\hat{g}(\varrho_i)\right),$$

where $\varrho_i$ are the irreducible representations of $G$.

== Fourier transform for finite abelian groups ==
If the group G is a finite abelian group, the situation simplifies considerably:

- all irreducible representations $\varrho_i$ are of degree 1 and hence equal to the irreducible characters of the group. Thus the matrix-valued Fourier transform becomes scalar-valued in this case.
- The set of irreducible G-representations has a natural group structure in its own right, which can be identified with the group $\widehat G := \mathrm{Hom}(G, S^1)$ of group homomorphisms from G to $S^1 = \{z \in \mathbb C, |z|=1\}$. This group is known as the Pontryagin dual of G.

The Fourier transform of a function $f : G \to \mathbb{C}$ is the function $\widehat{f}: \widehat{G}\to \mathbb{C}$ given by

$$\widehat{f}(\chi) = \sum_{a \in G} f(a) \bar{\chi}(a).$$

The inverse Fourier transform is then given by

$$f(a) = \frac{1}{|G|} \sum_{\chi \in \widehat{G}} \widehat{f}(\chi) \chi(a).$$
For $G = \mathbb Z/n \mathbb Z$, a choice of a primitive n-th root of unity $\zeta$ yields an isomorphism

$$G \to \widehat G,$$

given by $m \mapsto (r \mapsto \zeta^{mr})$. In the literature, the common choice is $\zeta = e^{2 \pi i /n}$, which explains the formula given in the article about the discrete Fourier transform. However, such an isomorphism is not canonical, similarly to the situation that a finite-dimensional vector space is isomorphic to its dual, but giving an isomorphism requires choosing a basis.

A property that is often useful in probability is that the Fourier transform of the uniform distribution is simply $\delta_{a,0}$, where 0 is the group identity and $\delta_{i,j}$ is the Kronecker delta.

Fourier Transform can also be done on cosets of a group.

== Relationship with representation theory ==
There is a direct relationship between the Fourier transform on finite groups and the representation theory of finite groups. The set of complex-valued functions on a finite group, $G$, together with the operations of pointwise addition and convolution, form a ring that is naturally identified with the group ring of $G$ over the complex numbers, $\mathbb{C}[G]$. Modules of this ring are the same thing as representations. Maschke's theorem implies that $\mathbb{C}[G]$ is a semisimple ring, so by the Artin–Wedderburn theorem it decomposes as a direct product of matrix rings. The Fourier transform on finite groups explicitly exhibits this decomposition, with a matrix ring of dimension $d_\varrho$ for each irreducible representation. More specifically, the Peter-Weyl theorem (for finite groups) states that there is an isomorphism
$$\mathbb C[G] \cong \bigoplus_{i} \mathrm{End}(V_i)$$
given by
$$\sum_{g \in G} a_g g \mapsto \left(\sum a_g \rho_i(g): V_i \to V_i\right)$$
The left hand side is the group algebra of G. The direct sum is over a complete set of inequivalent irreducible G-representations $\varrho_i : G \to \mathrm{GL}(V_i)$.

The Fourier transform for a finite group is just this isomorphism. The product formula mentioned above is equivalent to saying that this map is a ring isomorphism.

== Over other fields ==
The above representation theoretic decomposition can be generalized to fields $k$ other than $\mathbb{C}$ as long as $\text{char}(k) \nmid |G|$ via Maschke's theorem. That is, the group algebra $k[G]$ is semisimple. The same formulas may be used for the Fourier transform and its inverse, as crucially $\frac{1}{|G|}$ is defined in $k$.

== Modular case ==
When $\text{char}(k) \mid |G|$, $k[G]$ is no longer semisimple and one must consider the modular representation theory of $G$ over $k$. We can still decompose the group algebra into blocks via the Peirce decomposition using idempotents. That is

$k[G] \cong \bigoplus_i k[G]e_i$

and $1 = \sum_i e_i$ is a decomposition of the identity into central, primitive, orthogonal idempotents. Choosing a basis for the blocks $\text{span}_k \{g e_i | g \in G\}$ and writing the projection maps $v \mapsto v e_i$ as a matrix yields the modular DFT matrix.

For example, for the symmetric group the idempotents of $F_p[S_n]$ are computed in Murphy and explicitly in SageMath.

== Unitarity ==
One can normalize the above definition to obtain

$\hat{f}(\rho)=\sqrt{\frac{d_\rho}{|G|}}\sum_{g \in G}f(g)\rho(g)$

with inverse

$f(g)=\frac{1}{\sqrt{|G|}}\sum_{\rho \in \widehat{G}}\sqrt{d_\rho}\mathrm{Tr}(\hat{f}(\rho)\rho^{-1}(g))$.

Two representations are considered equivalent if one may be obtained from the other by a change of basis. This is an equivalence relation, and each equivalence class contains a unitary representation. The unitary representations can be obtained via Weyl's unitarian trick in characteristic zero. If $\widehat{G}$ consists of unitary representations, then the corresponding DFT will be unitary.

Over finite fields $F_{q^2}$, it is possible to find a change of basis in certain cases, for example the symmetric group, by decomposing the matrix $U$ associated to a $G$-invariant symmetric bilinear form as $U=AA^*$, where $^*$ denotes conjugate-transpose with respect to $x \mapsto x^q$ conjugation. The unitary representation is given by $A^*\rho(g)A^{* -1}$. To obtain the unitary DFT, note that as defined above $DFT.DFT^* = S$, where $S$ is a diagonal matrix consisting of +1's and -1's. We can factor $S=RR^*$ by factoring each sign $c_i = z_i z_i^*$. $uDFT = R^{-1}.DFT$ is unitary.

== Applications ==
This generalization of the discrete Fourier transform is used in numerical analysis. A circulant matrix is a matrix where every column is a cyclic shift of the previous one. Circulant matrices can be diagonalized quickly using the fast Fourier transform, and this yields a fast method for solving systems of linear equations with circulant matrices. Similarly, the Fourier transform on arbitrary groups can be used to give fast algorithms for matrices with other symmetries (Åhlander & Munthe-Kaas 2005). These algorithms can be used for the construction of numerical methods for solving partial differential equations that preserve the symmetries of the equations (Munthe-Kaas 2006).

When applied to the Boolean group $(\mathbb Z / 2 \mathbb Z)^n$, the Fourier transform on this group is the Hadamard transform, which is commonly used in quantum computing and other fields. Shor's algorithm uses both the Hadamard transform (by applying a Hadamard gate to every qubit) as well as the quantum Fourier transform. The former considers the qubits as indexed by the group $(\mathbb Z / 2 \mathbb Z)^n$ and the later considers them as indexed by $\mathbb Z / 2^n \mathbb Z$ for the purpose of the Fourier transform on finite groups.

== See also ==
- Fourier transform
- Least-squares spectral analysis
- Representation theory of finite groups
- Character theory
