= James Gibb =

James Gibb may refer to:

- James Gibb (Australian politician) (1843–1919)
- James Brunton Gibb (1897–1968), Australian performer and teacher of elocution
- James Gibb (Presbyterian minister) (1857–1935), Presbyterian minister in New Zealand
- James Gibb (British politician) (1844–1910), British Member of Parliament for Harrow
- James Gibb (pianist) (1918–2013), British pianist and teacher
- Jimmy Gibb, Northern Irish footballer

== See also ==
- James Gibbs (disambiguation)
