= Rademacher system =

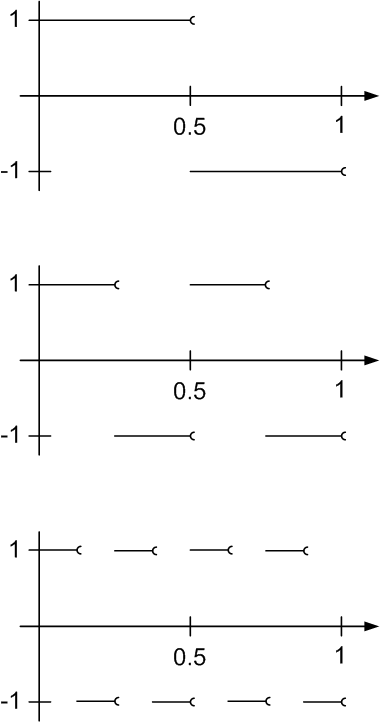

In mathematics, in particular in functional analysis, the Rademacher system, named after Hans Rademacher, is an incomplete orthonormal system of functions on the unit interval of the following form:

$$\{ t \mapsto r_{n}(t)=\sgn \left( \sin 2^{n+1} \pi t \right) ; t \in [0,1], n \in \N \}.$$

The Rademacher system is stochastically independent, and is closely related to the Walsh system. Specifically, the Walsh system can be constructed as a product of Rademacher functions.

To see that the Rademacher system is an incomplete orthonormal system and not an orthonormal basis, consider the function on the unit interval defined by the following equation:

$f(t) = 4 \left|x-\frac 12\right| - 1$

This function is orthogonal to all the functions in the Rademacher system, yet is nonzero.

Viewed as a sequence of random variables on the unit interval with the Lebesgue measure, the law of each $r_{n}$ is a Rademacher distribution, and the $r_{n}$'s are independent of each other. From Khintchine's inequality, it follows that the closed linear span of the Rademacher functions in $L^{p}$ is the same as the closed linear span in $L^{2}$.
