= Dyadic derivative =

Derivative defined on dyadic group

In mathematical analysis, the dyadic derivative is a concept that extends the notion of classical differentiation to functions defined on the dyadic group $\left(\mathbb{Z}/2\mathbb{Z}\right)^\mathbb{N} \cong \mathbb{F}_2[[X]]$, also known as the Cantor dyadic group, or functions defined on the dyadic field $\mathbb{F}_2((X))$, also known as the locally compact Cantor dyadic group or the 2-series local field.

== Definition ==
=== Pointwise dyadic derivative ===
For a function $f$ defined on [0,1), the first pointwise dyadic derivative of $f$ at a point $x$ is defined as:

$$f^{[1]}(x) = \lim_{m \to \infty} \sum_{j=0}^{m-1} 2^{j-1}[f(x) - f(x \oplus 2^{-j-1})]$$

if this limit exists. Here, $\oplus$ denotes the dyadic addition operation, which is defined using the dyadic (binary) representation of numbers. That is, if

$x = \sum_{j=0}^{\infty} x_j 2^{-j-1}$ and $y = \sum_{j=0}^{\infty} y_j 2^{-j-1}$ with $x_j, y_j \in \{0, 1\}$,

then

$$x \oplus y = \sum_{j=0}^{\infty} (x_j \oplus y_j) 2^{-j-1}$$,

where

$x_j \oplus y_j = (x_j + y_j) \pmod 2$.

Higher-order dyadic derivatives are defined recursively: $f^{[r]}(x) = (f^{[r-1]})^{[1]}(x)$ for $r \in \mathbb N$.

=== Strong dyadic derivative ===
The strong dyadic derivative is defined in the context of function spaces. Let $X(0, 1)$ denote one of the function spaces $L^p(0, 1)$ for $1 \le p \le \infty$ (L^{p} space); $L^\infty(0, 1)$ (L^{∞} space); or $C^\oplus[0, 1]$ (the space of dyadically continuous functions). If $f \in X(0, 1)$ and there exists $g \in X(0, 1)$ such that

$$\lim_{m \to \infty} \left\| \sum_{j=0}^{m-1} 2^{j-1}[f(\cdot) - f(\cdot \oplus 2^{-j-1})] - g(\cdot) \right\|_X = 0$$,

then $g$ is called the first strong dyadic derivative of $f$, denoted by $g = D^{[1]}f$. Higher-order derivatives can be defined recursively similar to pointwise dyadic derivatives.

== Properties ==
Similar to the classic derivative in calculus, the dyadic derivative possesses several properties.

=== Linearity ===
The dyadic derivative is a linear operator. If functions $f$ and $g$ are dyadically differentiable and $\alpha, \beta$ are constants, then $\alpha f + \beta g$ is dyadically differentiable:

$(\alpha f + \beta g)^{[1]} = \alpha f^{[1]} + \beta g^{[1]}$.

=== Closure ===
The dyadic differentiation operator is closed; that is, if $f$ is in the domain of the operator, then its dyadic derivative also belongs to the same function space.

=== Inverse operator ===
There exists a dyadic integration operator that serves as an inverse to the dyadic differentiation operator, analogous to the fundamental theorem of calculus.

=== Relationship to the Walsh-Fourier transform ===
For functions $f$ where $D^{[1]}f \in L_1(G)$ exists, the Walsh-Fourier transform satisfies:

$$[D^{[1]}f]^{\wedge}(\chi) = |\chi|\hat{f}(\chi)$$

for all characters $\chi$, where $|\chi|$ represents the norm of the character.

=== Eigenfunctions ===
The Walsh functions $\psi_k$ are eigenfunctions of the dyadic differentiation operator with corresponding eigenvalues related to their index:

$$D^{[1]}\psi_k = \psi_k^{[1]} = k\psi_k$$

and

$$D^{[r]}\psi_k = \psi_k^{[r]} = k^r \psi_k$$.

This eigenfunction property makes Walsh functions naturally suited for analysis involving dyadic derivatives, similar to how complex exponentials $e^{ikx}$ are eigenfunctions of classical differentiation.

=== Characterization of differentiable functions ===
Theorem (Skvorcov—Wade). Let $f$ be continuous on $[0, 1)$, and let $f^{[1]}$ exist for all but countably many points $x \in (0, 1)$. Then $f$ is constant.

A generalization of the above result shows that:

Theorem. A bounded function defined on $[0,1)$ with a countable set of discontinuities (exclusively of jump discontinuities) that have at most a finite number of cluster points is pointwise dyadically differentiable except on a countable set if and only if it is a piecewise constant function.

== Examples ==
Function type	Example	Dyadic derivative	Notes
Constant functions	$f(x) = C$ for all $x \in [0,1)$	$f^{[1]}(x) = 0$	Similar to classical calculus
Step functions	$$g(x) = \begin{cases} 3, & x \in [0,1/4) \\ -1, & x \in [1/4,1) \end{cases}$$	$$g^{[1]}(x) = \begin{cases} 6, & x \in [0,1/4) \\ -4, & x \in [1/4,1/2) \\ -2, & x \in [1/2,3/4) \\ 0, & x \in [3/4,1) \end{cases}$$	Creates additional discontinuities
Dirichlet function	$$d(x) = \begin{cases} 1, & x \in [0,1) \cap \mathbb{Q} \\ 0, & x \in [0,1) \setminus \mathbb{Q} \end{cases}$$	$d^{[1]}(x) = 0$ for all $x \in [0,1)$	Differentiable despite dense discontinuities
Walsh functions	$\psi_k(x)$	$\psi_k^{[1]}(x) = k\psi_k(x)$	Eigenfunctions of the dyadic derivative
Linear functions	$f(x) = x$	Not dyadic differentiable	Contrasts with classical calculus

== History ==
The dyadic derivative was introduced by mathematician James Edmund Gibbs in the context of Walsh functions and further developed by Paul Butzer and Heinz-Joseph Wagner. In 1977, C. W. Onneweer extended the concept to fractional differentiation and p-adic fields, and in 1979, he provided alternative definitions to the dyadic derivatives.

== See also ==
- Walsh function
- Haar wavelet
- Harmonic analysis
- Walsh transform
