= Bernstein–Vazirani algorithm =

Quantum algorithm

Apply the function using the oracle to a superposition of states and determine the secret string through measurement

The Bernstein–Vazirani algorithm, which solves the Bernstein–Vazirani problem, is a quantum algorithm invented by Ethan Bernstein and Umesh Vazirani in 1997. It is a restricted version of the Deutsch–Jozsa algorithm where instead of distinguishing between two different classes of functions, it tries to learn a string encoded in a function. The Bernstein–Vazirani algorithm was designed to prove an oracle separation between complexity classes BQP and BPP.

== Problem statement ==
Given an oracle that implements a function $f\colon\{0,1\}^n\rightarrow \{0,1\}$ in which $f(x)$ is promised to be the dot product between $x$ and a secret string $s \in \{0,1\}^n$ modulo 2, $f(x) = x \cdot s = x_1s_1 \oplus x_2s_2 \oplus \cdots \oplus x_ns_n$, find $s$.

== Algorithm ==
Classically, the most efficient method to find the secret string is by evaluating the function $n$ times with the input values $x = 2^{i}$ for all $i \in \{0, 1, \dots, n-1\}$:

$$\begin{align}
f(1000\cdots0_n) & = s_1 \\
f(0100\cdots0_n) & = s_2 \\
f(0010\cdots0_n) & = s_3 \\
& \,\,\,\vdots \\
f(0000\cdots1_n) & = s_n \\
\end{align}$$

In contrast to the classical solution which needs at least $n$ queries of the function to find $s$, only one query is needed using quantum computing. The quantum algorithm is as follows:

Apply a Hadamard transform to the $n$ qubit state $|0\rangle^{\otimes n}$ to get

$$\frac{1}{\sqrt{2^{n}}}\sum_{x=0}^{2^n-1} |x\rangle.$$

Next, apply the oracle $U_f$ which transforms $|x\rangle \to (-1)^{f(x)}|x\rangle$. This can be simulated through the standard oracle that transforms $|b\rangle|x\rangle \to |b \oplus f(x)\rangle |x\rangle$ by applying this oracle to $\frac{|0\rangle - |1\rangle}{\sqrt{2}}|x\rangle$. ($\oplus$ denotes addition mod two.) This transforms the superposition into

$$\frac{1}{\sqrt{2^{n}}}\sum_{x=0}^{2^n-1} (-1)^{f(x)} |x\rangle.$$

Another Hadamard transform is applied to each qubit which makes it so that for qubits where $s_i = 1$, its state is converted from $|-\rangle$ to $|1\rangle$ and for qubits where $s_i = 0$, its state is converted from $|+\rangle$ to $|0\rangle$. To obtain $s$, a measurement in the standard basis ($\{|0\rangle, |1\rangle\}$) is performed on the qubits.

Graphically, the algorithm may be represented by the following diagram, where $H^{\otimes n}$ denotes the Hadamard transform on $n$ qubits:

$$|0\rangle^n \xrightarrow{H^{\otimes n }} \frac{1}{\sqrt{2^n}} \sum_{x \in \{0,1\}^n} |x\rangle \xrightarrow{U_f} \frac{1}{\sqrt{2^n}}\sum_{x \in \{0,1\}^n}(-1)^{f(x)}|x\rangle \xrightarrow{H^{\otimes n}} \frac{1}{2^n} \sum_{x,y \in \{0,1\}^n}(-1)^{f(x) + x\cdot y}|y\rangle = |s\rangle$$

The reason that the last state is $|s\rangle$ is because, for a particular $y$,

$$\frac{1}{2^n}\sum_{x \in \{0,1\}^n}(-1)^{f(x) + x\cdot y}
= \frac{1}{2^n}\sum_{x \in \{0,1\}^n}(-1)^{x\cdot s + x\cdot y}
= \frac{1}{2^n}\sum_{x \in \{0,1\}^n}(-1)^{x\cdot (s \oplus y)}
= 1 \text{ if } s \oplus y = \vec{0},\, 0 \text{ otherwise}.$$

Since $s \oplus y = \vec{0}$ is only true when $s = y$, this means that the only non-zero amplitude is on $|s\rangle$. So, measuring the output of the circuit in the computational basis yields the secret string $s$.

A generalization of Bernstein–Vazirani problem has been proposed that involves finding one or more secret keys using a probabilistic oracle. This is an interesting problem for which a quantum algorithm can provide efficient solutions with certainty or with a high degree of confidence, while classical algorithms completely fail to solve the problem in the general case.

== Classical vs. quantum complexity ==
The Bernstein-Vazirani problem is usually stated in its non-decision version. In this form, it is an example of a problem solvable by a Quantum Turing machine (QTM) with $O(1)$ queries to the problem's oracle, but for which any Probabilistic Turing machine (PTM) algorithm must make $\Omega(n)$ queries.

To provide a separation between BQP and BPP, the problem must be reshaped into a decision problem (as these complexity classes refer to decision problems). This is accomplished with a recursive construction and the inclusion of a second, random oracle. The resulting decision problem is solvable by a QTM with $O(n)$ queries to the problem's oracle, while a PTM must make $\Omega(n^{\log n})$ queries to solve the same problem. Therefore, Bernstein-Vazirani provides a super-polynomial separation between BPP and BQP.

== See also ==
- Hidden Linear Function problem
- Simon's problem
