= James Gibbs (physician) =

English physician and poet

- Died: 1724; Tregony
- Occupations: Physician and poet

James Gibbs (died 1724) was an English physician and poet.

== Biography ==
Gibbs was the son of James Gibbs, vicar of Gorran in Cornwall. He was a student of Exeter College, Oxford. In a letter to Archbishop Tenison, preserved among the manuscripts in Lambeth Library, he solicits Tenison's ‘favour and assistance’ in promoting ‘a new metrical version of the Psalms.’ The letter is undated, but in 1701 the first fifteen of the psalms were published in London, and a second edition followed in 1712. A copy of the latter was discovered in Swift's library, containing some severe marginal criticism by the dean. Gibbs died at Tregony, Cornwall, in 1724.

He published:

- ‘A Consolatory Poem, humbly addressed to Her Royal Highness, Upon the much lamented death of His Most Illustrious Highness, William Duke of Gloucester,’ London, 1700, fol.
- ‘The First Fifteen Psalms of David, translated into Lyric Verse, propos'd as an essay, supplying the Perspicuity and Coherence according to the Modern Art of Poetry … With a Preface containing some observations of the great and general Defectiveness of former Versions in Greek, Latin, and English,’ London, 1701, 4to. The title-page of the second edition (1712) states that ‘some of the lords spiritual freely proposed to recommend’ it to ‘parliament and convocation.’
- ‘Observations of various eminent cures of scrophulous distempers, commonly called the King's Evil, such as tumours, ulcers, curiosity of bones, blindness, and consumptions … to which is added An Essay concerning the animal spirits and the cure of convulsions. …’ Exeter, 1712, sm. 4to. It contains an essay written in vindication of a trial at Launceston in 1710 concerning the cure of a lad from Plymouth. Some of the cases relate to persons living at Tregony, Gorran, and other places in Cornwall.

In manuscript are:

- ‘Carmen in honorem principis Poetarum, doct. Gibbesii, cum diploma a Cæsarea Majestate in Musarum templo concessum est,’ Worcester Coll. MS. No. 58, pp. 99–101;
- ‘Proposal of J. Gibbs to the Archbishop of Canterbury for a New Translation of the Psalms, with a printed translation of the first and second Psalm into English verse,’ Lambeth MS. 937, art. 24, 25.
