= Hadamard transform =

Involutive change of basis in linear algebra

The product of a Boolean function and a Hadamard matrix is its Walsh spectrum: (1, 0, 1, 0, 0, 1, 1, 0) × H(8) = (4, 2, 0, −2, 0, 2, 0, 2)

Fast Walsh–Hadamard transform, a faster way to calculate the Walsh spectrum of (1, 0, 1, 0, 0, 1, 1, 0).

The original function can be expressed by means of its Walsh spectrum as an arithmetical polynomial.

The Hadamard transform (also known as the Walsh–Hadamard transform, Hadamard–Rademacher–Walsh transform, Walsh transform, or Walsh–Fourier transform) is an example of a generalized class of Fourier transforms. It performs an orthogonal, symmetric, involutive, linear operation on a tuple of 2^{m} numbers.

The Hadamard transform can be regarded as being built out of size-2 discrete Fourier transforms (DFTs), and is in fact equivalent to a multidimensional DFT of size 2 × 2 × ⋯ × 2 × 2. It decomposes an arbitrary input vector into a superposition of Walsh functions.

The transform is named for the French mathematician Jacques Hadamard (French: [adamaʁ]), the German-American mathematician Hans Rademacher, and the American mathematician Joseph L. Walsh.

== Definition ==
The Hadamard transform H_{m} is a 2^{m} × 2^{m} matrix, the Hadamard matrix (scaled by a normalization factor), that transforms 2^{m} real numbers x_{n} into 2^{m} real numbers X_{k}. The Hadamard transform can be defined in two ways: recursively, or by using the binary (base-2) representation of the indices n and k.

Recursively, we define the 1 × 1 Hadamard transform H_{0} by the identity H_{0} = 1, and then define H_{m} for m > 0 by:
$$H_m = \frac{1}{2^{m/2}} \begin{pmatrix} H_{m-1} & H_{m-1} \\ H_{m-1} & -H_{m-1} \end{pmatrix}$$
where the division by 2^{m/2} is a normalization that is sometimes omitted.

For m > 1, we can also define H_{m} by:
$$H_m = H_{1} \otimes H_{m-1}$$
where $\otimes$ represents the Kronecker product. Thus, other than this normalization factor, the Hadamard matrices are made up entirely of 1 and −1.

Equivalently, we can define the Hadamard matrix by its (k, n)-th entry by writing
$$\begin{align}
k &= \sum^{m-1}_{j=0} {k_j 2^j} = k_{m-1} 2^{m-1} + k_{m-2} 2^{m-2} + \dots + k_1 2 + k_0 \\
n &= \sum^{m-1}_{j=0} {n_j 2^j} = n_{m-1} 2^{m-1} + n_{m-2} 2^{m-2} + \dots + n_1 2 + n_0
\end{align}$$

where the k_{j} and n_{j} are the bit elements (0 or 1) of k and n, respectively. Note that we index from 0, the element in the top left corner has $k = n = 0$. The (k, n)-th entry of the (normalized) Hadamard matrix is then as follows:
$$(H_m)_{k,n} = \frac{1}{2^{m/2}} (-1)^{\sum_{j=0}^{m-1} k_j n_j}$$

This is exactly the multidimensional $2 \times 2 \times \cdots \times 2 \times 2$ DFT, normalized to be unitary, if the inputs and outputs are regarded as multidimensional arrays indexed by the n_{j} and k_{j}, respectively. H_{1} can also be regarded as the Fourier transform on the two-element additive group of Z/(2).

The sum $\sum_{j=0}^{m-1} k_j n_j$ can be thought of as the bitwise dot product $k \cdot n$ of the binary representations of n and k. For example, with$m \;\geq\; 2$, the (3, 2) component is computed like so:
$$(H_m)_{3,2} \;=\;  (-1)^{3 \cdot 2} \;=\; (-1)^{(1,1) \cdot (1,0)} \;=\; (-1)^{1+0} \;=\; (-1)^1 \;=\; -1$$

Some examples of the Hadamard matrices follow.
$$\begin{align}
H_0 & = +\begin{pmatrix}1\end{pmatrix}\\[5pt]
H_1 & = \frac{1}{\sqrt2}
\left(\begin{array}{rr}
1 &  1\\
1 & -1
\end{array}\right)\\[5pt]
H_2 & = \frac{1}{2}
\left(\begin{array}{rrrr}
1 &  1 &  1 &  1\\
1 & -1 &  1 & -1\\
1 &  1 & -1 & -1\\
1 & -1 & -1 &  1
\end{array}\right)\\[5pt]
H_3 & = \frac{1}{2^{3/2}}
\left(\begin{array}{rrrrrrrr}
1 &  1 &  1 &  1 &  1 &  1 &  1 &  1\\
1 & -1 &  1 & -1 &  1 & -1 &  1 & -1\\
1 &  1 & -1 & -1 &  1 &  1 & -1 & -1\\
1 & -1 & -1 &  1 &  1 & -1 & -1 &  1\\
1 &  1 &  1 &  1 & -1 & -1 & -1 & -1\\
1 & -1 &  1 & -1 & -1 &  1 & -1 &  1\\
1 &  1 & -1 & -1 & -1 & -1 &  1 &  1\\
1 & -1 & -1 &  1 & -1 &  1 &  1 & -1
\end{array}\right)
\end{align}$$
The rows of the Hadamard matrices are the Walsh functions.

== Relation to Fourier transform ==
The Hadamard transform is equivalent to a multidimensional DFT of size 2 × 2 × ⋯ × 2 × 2.

Formally, the Hadamard transform is a Fourier transform on the Boolean group $(\Z / 2\Z)^n$. Using the Fourier transform on finite (abelian) groups, the Fourier transform of a function $f \colon (\Z/2\Z)^n \to \Complex$ is the function $\widehat f$ defined by
$$\widehat{f}(\chi) = \sum_{a \in (\Z/2\Z)^n} f(a) \bar{\chi}(a)$$
where $\chi$ is a character of $(\Z/2\Z)^n$. Each character has the form $\chi_r(a) = (-1)^{a \cdot r}$ for some $r \in (\Z/2\Z)^n$, where the multiplication is the boolean dot product on bit strings, so we can identify the input to $\widehat{f}$ with $r \in (\Z/2\Z)^n$ (Pontryagin duality) and define $\widehat f \colon (\Z/2\Z)^n \to \Complex$ by
$$\widehat{f}(r) = \sum_{a \in (\Z/2\Z)^n} f(a) (-1)^{r \cdot a}$$

This is the Hadamard transform of $f$, considering the input to $f$ and $\widehat{f}$ as boolean strings.

In terms of the above formulation where the Hadamard transform multiplies a vector of $2^n$ complex numbers $v$ on the left by the Hadamard matrix $H_n$ the equivalence is seen by taking $f$ to take as input the bit string corresponding to the index of an element of $v$, and having $f$ output the corresponding element of $v$.

The usual discrete Fourier transform, applied to a vector $v$ of $2^n$ complex numbers, instead uses characters of the cyclic group $\Z / 2^n \Z$. Consequently the DFT requires substantially more complicated arithmetic than the Hadamard transform. Unlike the DFT, the Hadamard transform is purely real, and in fact requires no multiplication, only sign flips.

== Computational complexity ==
In the classical domain, the Hadamard transform can be computed in $n \log n$ operations ($n = 2^m$), using the fast Hadamard transform algorithm.

In the quantum domain, the Hadamard transform can be computed in $O(1)$ time, as it is a quantum logic gate that can be parallelized.

== Quantum computing applications ==
The Hadamard transform is used extensively in quantum computing. The 2 × 2 Hadamard transform $H_1$ is the quantum logic gate known as the Hadamard gate, and the application of a Hadamard gate to each qubit of an $n$-qubit register in parallel is equivalent to the Hadamard transform $H_n$.

=== Hadamard gate ===
In quantum computing, the Hadamard gate is a one-qubit rotation, mapping the qubit-basis states $|0 \rangle$ and $|1 \rangle$ to two superposition states with equal weight of the computational basis states $|0 \rangle$ and $|1 \rangle$. Usually the phases are chosen so that
$$H=\frac{|0\rangle+|1\rangle}{\sqrt{2}}\langle0|+\frac{|0\rangle-|1\rangle}{\sqrt{2}}\langle1|$$

in Dirac notation. This corresponds to the transformation matrix
$$H_1=\frac{1}{\sqrt{2}}\begin{pmatrix} 1 & 1 \\ 1 & -1 \end{pmatrix}$$
in the $|0 \rangle , |1 \rangle$ basis, also known as the computational basis. The states $\frac{\left|0\right\rangle + \left|1\right\rangle}{\sqrt{2}}$ and $\frac{\left|0\right\rangle - \left|1\right\rangle}{\sqrt{2}}$ are known as $\left|\boldsymbol{+}\right\rangle$ and $\left|\boldsymbol{-}\right\rangle$ respectively, and together constitute the polar basis in quantum computing.

=== Hadamard gate operations ===
$$\begin{align}
H(|0\rangle) &= \frac{1}{\sqrt 2}|0\rangle + \frac{1}{\sqrt{2}}|1\rangle =: |+\rangle\\
H(|1\rangle) &= \frac{1}{\sqrt 2}|0\rangle - \frac{1}{\sqrt{2}}|1\rangle =: |-\rangle\\
H(|+\rangle) &= H\left( \frac{1}{\sqrt 2}|0\rangle + \frac{1}{\sqrt{2}}|1\rangle \right) = \frac{1}{2}\Big( |0\rangle + |1\rangle\Big) + \frac{1}{2}\Big(|0\rangle - |1\rangle\Big) = |0\rangle\\
H(|-\rangle) &= H\left( \frac{1}{\sqrt 2}|0\rangle - \frac{1}{\sqrt{2}}|1\rangle \right) = \frac{1}{2}\Big( |0\rangle + |1\rangle\Big) - \frac{1}{2}\Big(|0\rangle - |1\rangle\Big) = |1\rangle
\end{align}$$

One application of the Hadamard gate to either a 0 or 1 qubit will produce a quantum state that, if observed, will be a 0 or 1 with equal probability (as seen in the first two operations). This is exactly like flipping a fair coin in the standard probabilistic model of computation. However, if the Hadamard gate is applied twice in succession (as is effectively being done in the last two operations), then the final state is always the same as the initial state.

=== Hadamard transform in quantum algorithms ===
Computing the quantum Hadamard transform is simply the application of a Hadamard gate to each qubit individually because of the tensor product structure of the Hadamard transform. This simple result means the quantum Hadamard transform requires $\log_2 N$ operations, compared to the classical case of $N \log_2 N$ operations.

For an $n$-qubit system, Hadamard gates acting on each of the $n$ qubits (each initialized to the $|0\rangle$) can be used to prepare uniform quantum superposition states when $N$ is of the form $N = 2^n$. In this case with $n$ qubits, the combined Hadamard gate $H_n$ is expressed as the tensor product of $n$ Hadamard gates: $H_n = \underbrace{H \otimes H \otimes \ldots \otimes H}_{n \text{ times}}$

The resulting uniform quantum superposition state is then: $H_{n} |0\rangle^{\otimes n} = \frac{1}{\sqrt{2^n}} \sum_{j=0}^{2^n-1} |j\rangle$ This generalizes the preparation of uniform quantum states using Hadamard gates for any $N = 2^n$.

Measurement of this uniform quantum state results in a random state between $|0\rangle$ and $|N-1\rangle$.

Many quantum algorithms use the Hadamard transform as an initial step, since as explained earlier, it maps n qubits initialized with $|0 \rangle$ to a superposition of all 2^{n} orthogonal states in the $|0 \rangle , |1 \rangle$ basis with equal weight. For example, this is used in the Deutsch–Jozsa algorithm, Simon's algorithm, the Bernstein–Vazirani algorithm, and in Grover's algorithm. Note that Shor's algorithm uses both an initial Hadamard transform, as well as the quantum Fourier transform, which are both types of Fourier transforms on finite groups; the first on $(\Z / 2 \Z)^n$ and the second on $\Z /2^n \Z$.

Preparation of uniform quantum superposition states in the general case, when $N$ ≠ $2^n$ is non-trivial and requires more work. An efficient and deterministic approach for preparing the superposition state
$$|\Psi\rangle = \frac{1}{\sqrt{N}} \sum_{j=0}^{N-1} |j\rangle$$
with a gate complexity and circuit depth of only $O(\log_2 N)$ for all $N$ was recently presented. This approach requires only $n = \lceil \log_2 N \rceil$ qubits. Importantly, neither ancilla qubits nor any quantum gates with multiple controls are needed in this approach for creating the uniform superposition state $|\Psi\rangle$.

=== Convolutional neural networks ===
The Hadamard transform has found applications in quantum machine learning, particularly in hybrid quantum-classical neural networks. Dyadic convolution between two vectors is equivalent to element-wise multiplication of their Hadamard transform representations; thus convolutional layers can be performed efficiently by taking the Hadamard transform, multiplying, and then inverting the Hadamard transform. While classical computation of the Hadamard transform requires O(n log n) operations using the fast Hadamard transform algorithm, the quantum implementation can compute the transform in O(1) time by applying Hadamard gates to all qubits simultaneously.

== Application in evolutionary biology ==
The Hadamard transform can be used to estimate phylogenetic trees from molecular data. In principle, the Hadamard transform can be applied to many different models of sequence evolution, but the case of greatest interest uses data from nucleic acids (NAs).

Formally, consider the four possible strand nucleobases as elements of the Klein 4-group V acting on itself. One C_{2} axis corresponds to transitions and the other to transversions. NA sequences of length k are elements of V^{k}, and a given index into these length-k sequences is called a site. A phylogenetic tree T is a tree, rooted at some r, in which each point has been identified with a NA sequence.

In biological applications, one would like to specify mutation rates for each edge of T and then compute the resulting probability of observing T. Ideally, this process should be easily invertible, such that an optimization algorithm can find a (tree, mutation rate) pair producing the observed DNA sequences with maximum likelihood. In fact, this can be done with the Hadamard transform, as follows.

Let I be the power set of T\{r}, and consider the following I^{2}-indexed vector x. Each site j determines a σ_{1}∈I, the set of points with a transition relative to r at site j. Likewise transversions determine another σ_{2}∈I for each site. Then x_{(σ_{1},σ_{2})} is the proportion (out of {1,...,k}) of sites determining (σ_{1},σ_{2}).

The linear operator H:ℝ^{I^{2}}→ℝ^{I^{2}} with (σ,τ)th coefficient (−1)^{|σ_{1}∩τ_{1}|+|σ_{2}∩τ_{2}|} is a Hadamard matrix; in fact, it defines a Hadamard transform when I is enumerated in a certain order. Let

γ = H^{−1} log^{⊗I^{2}}(Hx)

where the ⊗I^{2} indicates that the logarithm acts on each component of the vector. Then γ is almost the mutation rates m necessary to produce the observed probability distribution x, as follows.

For the full Kimura model, with all 4 nucleic acids distinguished, there are three free parameters for each edge. Converting these values to the corresponding entry in γ requires conjugation of another logarithm with a 3×3 matrix.

If the sequences are instead RY-coded, then the relationship is much simpler. In that case, x and γ are indexed by I (rather than I^{2}), as can m be: for even-sized σ∈I, let E(σ)=σ; for odd-sized σ∈I, let E(σ)=σ⊔{r}; and let m_{σ} be the mutation rate on the edge disconnecting σ from the rest of T. (m is not quite a measured quantity, as it includes the probability of reverted mutations. It is related to the observed probability of character change via

m_{σ}=−1/2log(1-2p_{σ})

where p is the observed probability.) Then γ=m.

This technique can also be generalized to the case in which different sites mutate at different rates.

In all cases, the time complexity of determining the tree is dominated by the Hadamard transform, which takes O(|T|2^{|T|})-many steps. However, algorithms can reconstruct the tree by piecing together smaller trees constructed from a subset of T.

== Other applications ==
The Hadamard transform is also used in data encryption, as well as many signal processing and data compression algorithms, such as JPEG XR and MPEG-4 AVC. In video compression applications, it is usually used in the form of the sum of absolute transformed differences. It is also a crucial part of significant number of algorithms in quantum computing. The Hadamard transform is also applied in experimental techniques such as NMR, mass spectrometry and crystallography. It is additionally used in some versions of locality-sensitive hashing, to obtain pseudo-random matrix rotations.

== See also ==
- Fast Walsh–Hadamard transform
- Pseudo-Hadamard transform
- Haar transform
- Generalized distributive law
