= Exact quantum polynomial time =

Computer science

In computational complexity theory, exact quantum polynomial time (EQP or sometimes QP) is the class of decision problems that can be solved by a quantum computer with zero error probability and in guaranteed worst-case polynomial time. It is the quantum analogue of the complexity class P. This is in contrast to bounded-error quantum computing, where quantum algorithms are expected to run in polynomial time, but may not always do so.

In the original definition of EQP, each language was computed by a single quantum Turing machine (QTM), using a finite gate set whose amplitudes could be computed in polynomial time. However, some results have required the use of an infinite gate set. The amplitudes in the gate set are typically algebraic numbers.
