= AMD XDNA =

AMD neural processing unit microarchitecture

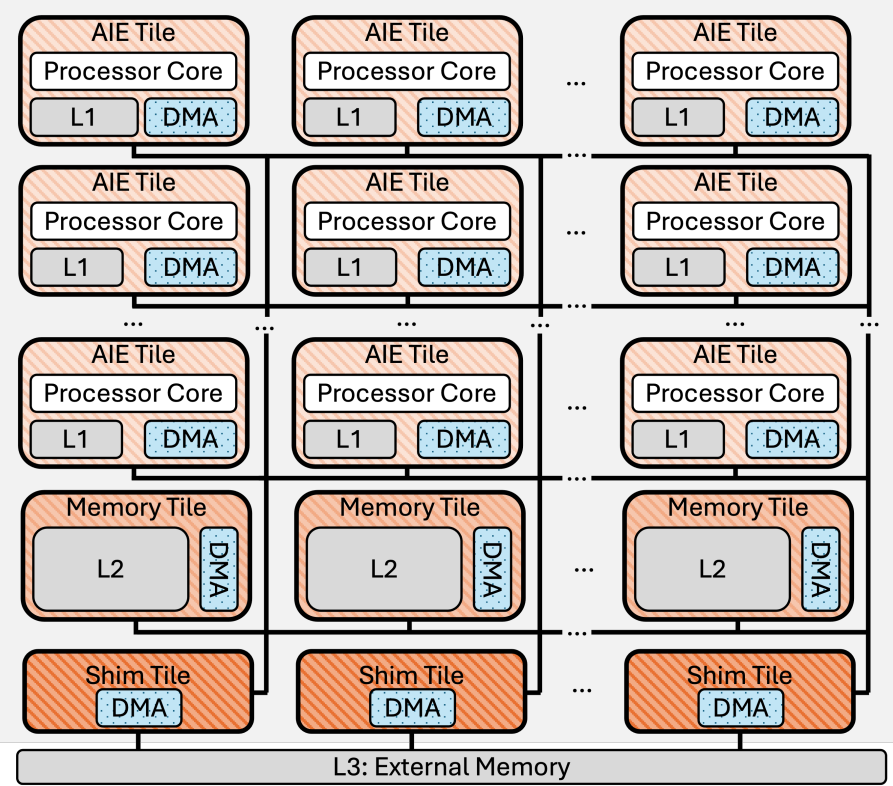
- Simplified diagram of an AMD XDNA NPU such as found in Ryzen 7040 processors
- Design firm: AMD
- Introduced: April 2023
- Type: Neural processing unit microarchitecture

XDNA is a microarchitecture for deep learning processor developed by AMD. It is designed to handle Machine learning (ML)-related tasks, such as artificial intelligence (AI) software. It is based on Xilinx technology, which AMD acquired in 2022. XDNA-based silicon designs are incorporated into the company's Ryzen AI-branded processors where it supplements the Zen CPU and RDNA GPU on the same chip.

== Architecture and features ==
XDNA employs a spatial dataflow architecture, where AI Engine (AIE) tiles process data in parallel with minimal external memory access. This design leverages parallelism and data locality to optimize performance and power efficiency. Each AIE tile contains:

- A VLIW + SIMD vector processor optimized for high-throughput compute tasks and tensor operations.
- A scalar RISC-style processor responsible for control flow and auxiliary operations.
- Local memory blocks for storing weights, activations, and intermediate coefficients, reducing dependency on external DRAM and lowering latency.
- On-chip program and data memories that further reduce latency and power by minimizing external memory traffic.
- Dedicated DMA engines and programmable interconnects for deterministic and high-bandwidth data transfers between tiles.

The tile arrays are scalable and modular, allowing AMD to configure NPUs with varying tile counts to fit different power, area, and performance targets. Operating frequencies typically reach up to 1.3 GHz, adjustable according to thermal and power constraints.

== Generations ==
=== First generation (XDNA) ===
The initial XDNA NPU launched in early 2023 with the Ryzen 7040 "Phoenix" series, achieving up to 10 TOPS (Tera Operations Per Second) in mobile form factors.

=== First-generation refresh: Hawk Point ===
Released in 2024, the Ryzen 8040 "Hawk Point" series improves the NPU through firmware updates, higher clock speeds, and tuning enhancements, pushing performance to around 16 TOPS.

=== Second generation (XDNA 2) ===
XDNA 2 debuted with the Ryzen AI 300 and PRO 300 mobile processors based on Zen 5 microarchitecture. This generation drastically increased AI throughput, reaching up to 55 TOPS on flagship models.

== Microarchitecture internals ==
XDNA's core is a spatially arranged array of AI Engine tiles, enabling parallel and pipelined processing of ML workloads. Each tile includes:

- VLIW + SIMD vector cores optimized for common ML operators such as matrix multiplications and convolutions.
- A scalar control processor for sequencing instructions and managing tile-level operations.
- On-chip SRAM blocks storing model parameters and intermediate data to minimize costly external memory accesses.
- Programmable DMA controllers and a low-latency interconnect fabric facilitating deterministic data movement with minimal stalls.

This architectural design enables low-latency, high-bandwidth computation essential for real-time AI inference in edge devices.

== Benefits ==
- Deterministic latency: The spatial dataflow architecture ensures predictable and consistent inference timings, crucial for real-time applications.
- Power efficiency: On-chip local memory usage reduces external DRAM accesses, lowering power consumption compared to traditional GPU or CPU approaches.
- Compute density: High TOPS in a compact silicon area enables integration into thin and light devices such as ultrabooks and portable workstations.
- Scalability: The modular tile design supports scaling from lightweight mobile devices with few tiles to enterprise-class servers with many tiles.

== Product integration ==
Model	NPU architecture	CPU cores / threads	NPU peak TOPS	Notes
Ryzen 7040 "Phoenix"	XDNA (1st gen)	up to 8C / 16T	~10 TOPS	Initial XDNA launch in ultrabooks
Ryzen 8040 "Hawk Point"	XDNA (1st gen refresh)	up to 8C / 16T	~16 TOPS	Improved NPU clock/tuning
Ryzen AI 300 / PRO 300 ("Strix Point")	XDNA 2	up to 12C / 24T	~50–55 TOPS	Flagship mobile AI CPUs
Ryzen AI 5 330	XDNA 2	4C / 8T	~50 TOPS	Entry-level AI chip with full NPU enabled

== Software and ecosystem ==
XDNA is supported via AMD’s ROCm (Radeon Open Compute) and Vitis AI software stacks, enabling developers to utilize the NPU for accelerating AI workloads efficiently. Popular ML frameworks such as ONNX, TensorFlow, and PyTorch are supported through these tools. Additionally, Microsoft Windows ML runtime integrates AMD NPU acceleration in devices marketed as Copilot+ PCs, enabling local AI inference without cloud dependency. FastFlowLM can be used for LLM inference on Linux and Windows.

== Limitations ==
- Advertised TOPS are theoretical maximums; actual performance varies based on thermal headroom, workload specifics, and driver/software optimizations.
- Some entry-level models disable or limit NPU functionality to save power and reduce die area.
- The software ecosystem and tooling are evolving, with continued improvements expected to fully exploit hardware capabilities.

== See also ==
- Neural Processing Unit
- Apple Neural Engine
- Tensor Processing Unit
- AI engine
- Xilinx
