= AHDL =

AHDL may refer to:

- Altera Hardware Description Language
- Analog Hardware Description Language; see field-programmable analog array
- Archives d'histoire doctrinale et littéraire du Moyen Âge, a scholarly journal publishing medieval historical and literary studies
