= Neural processing unit =

Hardware acceleration unit for artificial intelligence tasks

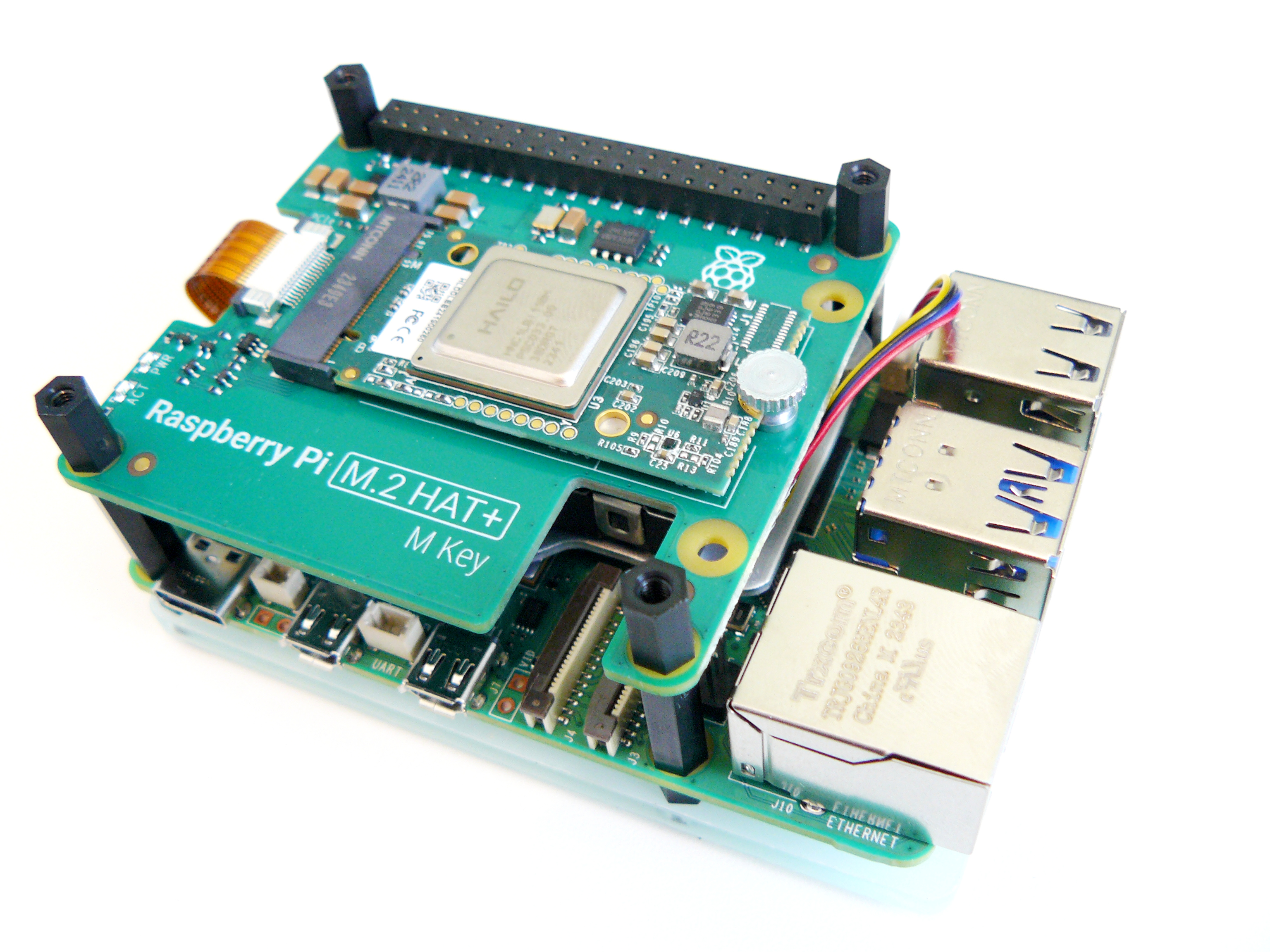
A Hailo AI Accelerator Module attached to a Raspberry Pi 5 via an M.2 adapter hat (2024)

A neural processing unit (NPU), also known as an AI accelerator or deep learning processor, is a class of specialized hardware accelerator or computer system designed to accelerate artificial intelligence and machine learning applications, including artificial neural networks and computer vision. An NPU can be a standalone unit, a part of a central processing unit (CPU), or a part of a graphics processing unit (GPU).

== History ==
An early use of the term neural processing unit (NPU) to refer to a dedicated neural-network accelerator appeared in the 2012 paper Neural Acceleration for General-Purpose Approximate Programs, which described an NPU architecture for accelerating approximate programs.

== Use ==
NPU's purpose is either to efficiently execute already trained AI models like language models for inference, or to train AI models. NPUs can be more efficient in terms of speed or power consumption.

NPU applications include algorithms for robotics, Internet of things, and data-intensive or sensor-driven tasks. They are often manycore or spatial designs and focus on low-precision arithmetic, novel dataflow architectures, or in-memory computing capability. As of 2024, a widely used datacenter-grade AI integrated circuit chip, the Nvidia H100 GPU, contains tens of billions of metal–oxide–semiconductor field-effect transistors (MOSFETs).

=== Consumer devices ===
AI accelerators are used in Apple silicon, Qualcomm, Samsung, Huawei, and Google Tensor smartphone processors. When used as part of a GPU for graphics rendering, they can significantly reduce resource use by allowing the traditional parts of the GPU to render a scene at a much lower resolution and frame rate (e.g., 540p at 30 frames per second (fps)) and then using a pre-trained AI model on the NPU to turn that base imagery into smoother and higher resolution output (e.g., 2160p at 240 fps) in real-time.

Vision processing units are accelerators specialized for machine vision algorithms such as convolutional neural networks (CNN) and scale-invariant feature transform (SIFT). They are used in devices that need to keep track of objects visually such as augmented reality (AR) headsets and drones.

The technology has been incorporated by multiple manufacturers such as Apple (circa 2022), AMD, and Intel. All models of Intel Meteor Lake processors have a built-in versatile processor unit (VPU) for accelerating inference for computer vision and deep learning.

On consumer devices, the NPU is intended to be small, power-efficient, but reasonably fast when used to run small models. To do this they are designed to support low-bitwidth operations using data types such as INT4, INT8, FP8, and FP16. A common metric is trillions of operations per second (TOPS). Although TOPS does not explicitly specify the kind of operations, it is typically INT8 additions and multiplications.

=== Datacenters ===
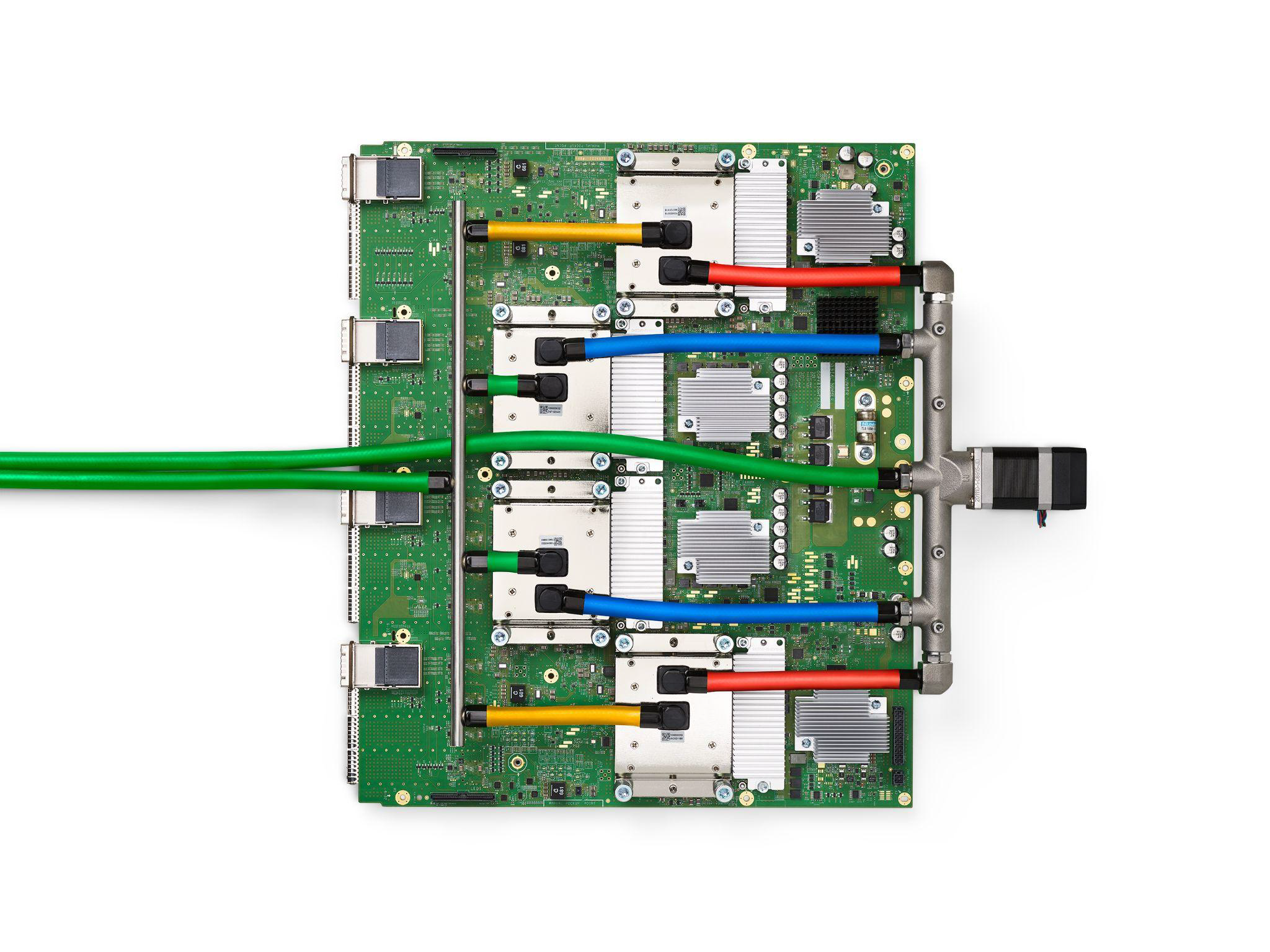
The Google Tensor Processing Unit (TPU) v4 package (ASIC in center plus 4 HBM stacks) and printed circuit board (PCB) with 4 liquid-cooled packages; the board's front panel has 4 top-side PCIe connectors (2023).

Accelerators are used in cloud computing servers: e.g., TPUs for Google Cloud Platform, and Trainium and Inferentia chips for Amazon Web Services. Many vendor-specific terms exist for devices in this category, and it is an emerging technology without a dominant design.

Since the late 2010s, GPUs designed by companies such as Nvidia and AMD often include AI-specific hardware in the form of dedicated functional units for low-precision matrix-multiplication operations. These GPUs are commonly used as AI accelerators, both for training and inference.

=== Scientific computation ===
Although NPUs are tailored for low-precision (e.g., FP16, INT8) matrix multiplication operations, they can be used to emulate higher-precision matrix multiplications in scientific computing. As modern GPUs place much focus on making the NPU part fast, using emulated FP64 (Ozaki scheme) on NPUs can potentially outperform native FP64. This has been demonstrated using FP16-emulated FP64 on NVidia Titan RTX and using INT8-emulated FP64 on NVIDIA consumer GPUs and the A100 GPU. Consumer GPUs especially benefited as they have limited FP64 hardware capacity, showing a 6× speedup. Since CUDA Toolkit 13.0 Update 2, cuBLAS automatically uses INT8-emulated FP64 matrix multiplication of the equivalent precision if it is faster than native. This is in addition to the FP16-emulated FP32 feature introduced in version 12.9.

== Programming ==
An operating system or a higher-level library may provide application programming interfaces such as TensorFlow with LiteRT Next (Android), CoreML (iOS, macOS) or DirectML (Windows). Formats such as ONNX are used to represent trained neural networks.

Consumer CPU-integrated NPUs are accessible through vendor-specific APIs. AMD (Ryzen AI), Intel (OpenVINO), Apple silicon (CoreML), (Note: MLX builds atop the CPU and GPU parts, not the Apple Neural Engine (ANE) part of Apple Silicon chips. The relatively good performance is due to the use of a large, fast unified memory design.) and Qualcomm (SNPE) each have their own APIs, which can be built upon by a higher-level library.

GPUs generally use existing GPGPU pipelines such as CUDA and OpenCL adapted for lower precisions and specialized matrix-multiplication operations. Vulkan is also being used. Custom-built systems such as the Google TPU use private interfaces.

There are a large number of separate underlying acceleration APIs and compilers/runtimes in use in the AI field, causing a great increase in software development effort due to the many combinations involved. As of 2025, the open standard organization Khronos Group is pursuing standardization of AI-related interfaces to reduce the amount of work needed. Khronos is working on three separate fronts: expansion of data types and intrinsic operations in OpenCL and Vulkan, inclusion of compute graphs in SPIR-V, and a NNEF/SkriptND file format for describing a neural network.

== See also ==
- AI engine – AMD computing architecture
- Application-specific integrated circuit – Integrated circuit customized for a specific task
- Ray tracing hardware – Type of 3D graphics accelerator
- Wetware computer – Computer composed of organic material
