= Sinkclose =

AMD processor security vulnerability

CVE-2023-31315
- CVSS 3.x score: 7.5
- CVSS 3.x vector: CVSS:3.1/AV:L/AC:H/PR:H/UI:N/S:C/C:H/I:H/A:H
- Date discovered: Publicly disclosed August 9, 2024; 2 years ago
- Affected hardware: AMD processors since 2006

Sinkclose is a security vulnerability in certain AMD microprocessors dating back to 2006 that was made public by IOActive security researchers on August 9, 2024. IOActive researchers Enrique Nissim and Krzysztof Okupski presented their findings at the 2024 DEF CON security conference in Las Vegas in a talk titled "AMD Sinkclose: Universal Ring-2 Privilege Escalation".

AMD said it would patch all affected Zen-based Ryzen, Epyc and Threadripper processors but initially omitted Ryzen 3000 desktop processors. AMD followed up and said the patch would be available for them as well. AMD said the patches would be released on August 20, 2024.

== Mechanism ==
Sinkclose affects the System Management Mode (SMM) of AMD processors. It can only be exploited by first compromising the operating system kernel. Once the exploit is effected, it is possible to avoid detection by antivirus software and even compromise a system after the operating system has been re-installed.
