= Incisive =

Incisive may refer to:

== Medical uses ==
- Incisor teeth, front teeth present in most heterodont mammals.
- Incisive bone, the portion of maxilla adjacent to the incisors.
- Incisive foramen or anterior palatine foramen, a funnel-shaped opening in the bone of hard palate immediately behind incisor teeth.
- Incisive canals or foramina of Stensen.
- Incisive papilla, projection on the palate near the incisors.

== Others ==
- Incisive Media, a publisher of business media, based in London, United Kingdom.
- NCSim, a suite of tools from Cadence Design Systems related to the design and verification of ASICs, SoCs, and FPGAs.
