= Chronologic Simulation =

Electronic Design Automation simulation developing company

- Type: Private
- Headquarters: Los Altos, California, United States
- Key people: John Sanguinetti, CEO and founder; Peter Eichenberger, CTO and founder; Michael McNamara, VP Engineering; Simon Davidmann, VP Europe

Chronologic Simulation was a company based in Los Altos, California, United States which provided Verilog HDL simulation products. Chronologic Simulation's main product was the Verilog Compiled Simulator (VCS) HDL simulator. In 1994 Chronologic was sold to Viewlogic Systems and in 1997 Viewlogic was acquired by Synopsys, Inc.

== Background ==
In the late 1980s and early 1990s integrated circuits were being designed and verified in Verilog HDL simulators. These simulators were focused on gate level speed and were implemented as language interpreters. Verilog HDL was proprietary and owned by Cadence Design Systems after their acquisition in 1989 of Gateway Design Automation.

There was competition to Verilog from the US DoD VHDL language that became an IEEE standard and in 1991 Cadence made the proprietary Verilog HDL public and created Open Verilog International (OVI) (later renamed Accellera) to standardize it.

== Founding and development ==
Chronologic was founded in 1991 by Peter Eichenberger. Founding members included John Sanguinetti, Peter Eichenberger, Michael McNamara, Martin Harding, and Simon Davidmann.

The development of the Verilog Compiled Simulator (VCS) started in 1991 with early development by Sanguinetti, Eichenberger, and McNamara and by 1993 the first version was released, Harding and Davidmann started up the sales channel, and VCS was in use with commercial users and in education and research. VCS initially parsed the Verilog source and using software compiler techniques created C code which is then subsequently compiled into executable binaries to run on the native host computer. The performance of existing Verilog simulators was excellent at the gate level but lacked needed speed at the RTL level. Chronologic's VCS focused on RTL speed and by using cycle based and compiler optimization techniques was often reported as being 10-40 times faster than other commercial products.

== Acquisition ==
Chronologic Simulation was acquired in 1994 for $26.5 million by Viewlogic Systems, Inc. though there were complications that resulted in lawsuits that were ultimately resolved in 1995. In 1997 Synopsys, Inc., acquired Viewlogic for $497 million.

== Status ==
VCS is still used and has been kept up to date with the evolution in the Verilog language, including features from Superlog that became part of SystemVerilog around 2005. VCS is a part of Synopsys verification solutions.
