= ModelSim =

Siemens multi-language environment

ModelSim is a multi-language environment by Siemens (previously developed by Mentor Graphics,) for simulation of hardware description languages such as VHDL, Verilog and SystemC, and includes a built-in C debugger. ModelSim can be used independently, or in conjunction with Intel Quartus Prime, PSIM, Xilinx ISE or Xilinx Vivado. Simulation is performed using the graphical user interface (GUI), or automatically using scripts.

== Editions ==
Mentor HDL simulation products are offered in multiple editions, such as ModelSim PE and Questa Sim.

Questa Sim offers high-performance and advanced debugging capabilities, while ModelSim PE is the entry-level simulator for hobbyists and students. Questa Sim is used in large multi-million gate designs, and is supported on Microsoft Windows and Linux, in 32-bit and 64-bit architectures.

ModelSim can also be used with MATLAB/Simulink, using Link for ModelSim. Link for ModelSim is a fast bidirectional co-simulation interface between Simulink and ModelSim. For such designs, MATLAB provides a numerical simulation toolset, while ModelSim provides tools to verify the hardware implementation & timing characteristics of the design.

== Language support ==
ModelSim uses a unified kernel for simulation of all supported languages, and the method of debugging embedded C code is the same as VHDL or Verilog.

ModelSim and Questa Sim products enable simulation, verification and debugging for the following languages:

- VHDL
- Verilog
- Verilog 2001
- SystemVerilog
- PSL
- SystemC

== See also ==
- Intel Quartus Prime
- Icarus Verilog
- List of HDL simulators
- NCSim
- Verilator
- Xilinx ISE
- Xilinx Vivado
