= Ryzen =

AMD brand for microprocessors

General information
- Launched: March 2, 2017; 9 years ago
- Marketed by: AMD
- Designed by: AMD
- Common manufacturers: GlobalFoundries (14 nm and 12 nm only); TSMC (7 nm and beyond)

Performance
- Max. CPU clock rate: 1.2 GHz to 5.7 GHz
- HyperTransport speeds: 800 MT/s to 2 GT/s

Physical specifications
- Cores: Mainstream: 4‍–‍16; High-end desktop: 8‍–‍64; Workstation: 12‍–‍96
- GPU: Radeon (APU variants)
- Sockets: Mainstream desktop: AM4, AM5; High-end desktop: TR4, sTRX4, sWRX8, sTR5

Architecture and classification
- Technology node: 14 nm to 4 nm
- Microarchitecture: Zen (Zen, Zen+, Zen 2, Zen 3, Zen 3+, Zen 4, Zen 5)
- Instruction set: Main processor: x86‑64; Platform Security Processor: ARMv7-A
- Extensions: MMX(+), SSE1, SSE2, SSE3, SSSE3, SSE4a, SSE4.1, SSE4.2, AVX, AVX2, AVX-512 with Zen 4, FMA3, CVT16/F16C, ABM, BMI1, BMI2 AES, CLMUL, RDRAND, SHA, SME AMD-V, AMD-Vi
- Variants: Threadripper (high-end desktop and workstation); Athlon (low-end desktop and mobile); Epyc (server and embedded)

History
- Predecessors: A-Series; FX

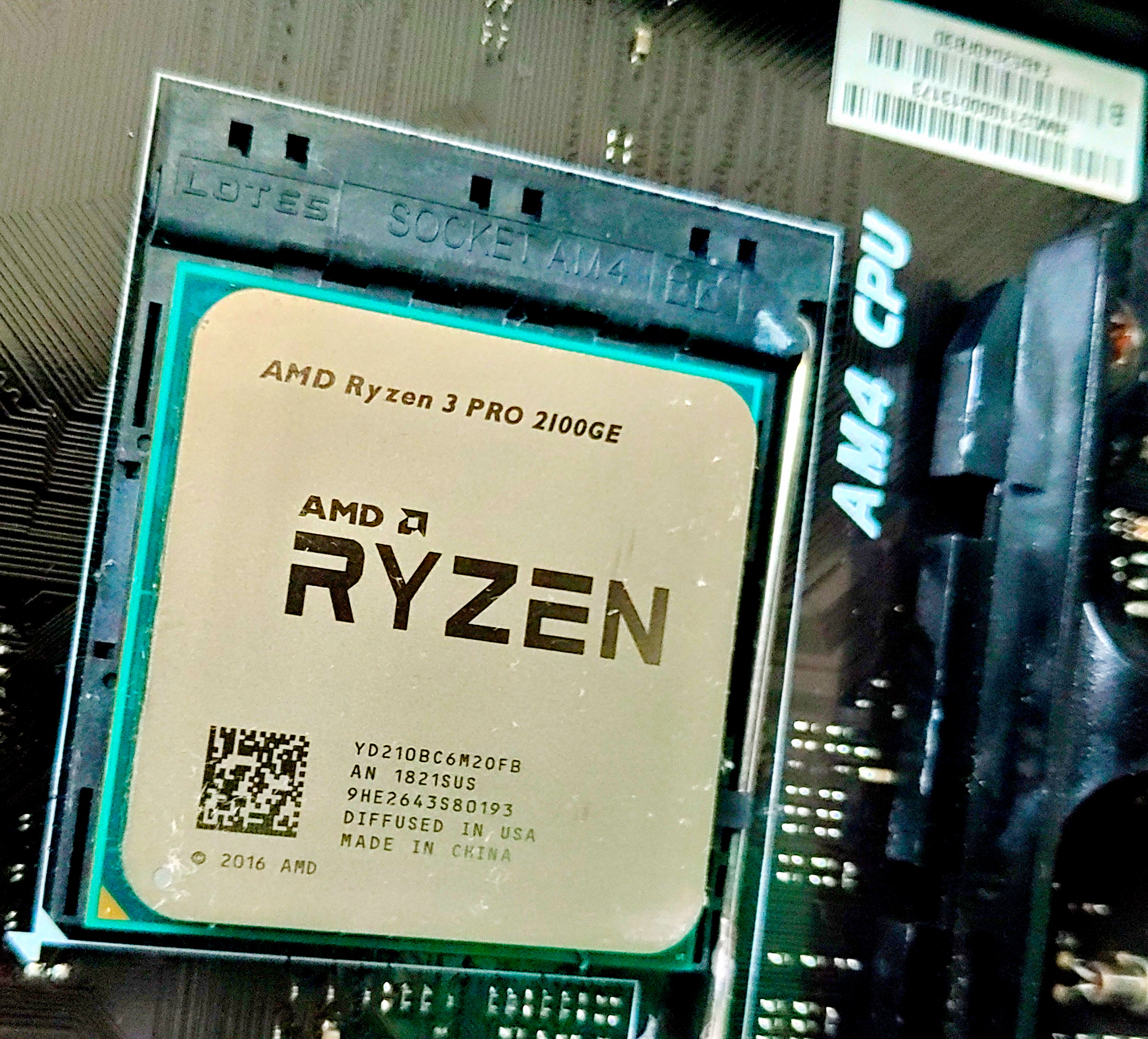
Ryzen 3 PRO 2100GE

Ryzen (/ˈraɪzən/ RY-zən) is a brand of multi-core x86-64 microprocessors, designed and marketed by AMD for desktop, mobile, server, and embedded platforms, based on the Zen microarchitecture. It consists of central processing units (CPUs) marketed for mainstream, enthusiast, server, and workstation segments; accelerated processing units (APUs), marketed for mainstream and entry-level segments and embedded systems applications.

A majority of AMD's desktop Ryzen products use the AM4 and AM5 platforms. In August 2017, AMD launched their Ryzen Threadripper line aimed at the enthusiast and workstation markets. Ryzen Threadripper uses different, larger sockets such as TR4, sTRX4, sWRX8, and sTR5, which support additional memory channels and PCI Express lanes. AMD moved to the AM5 platform for consumer desktop Ryzen with the release of Zen 4 products in late 2022.

== History ==
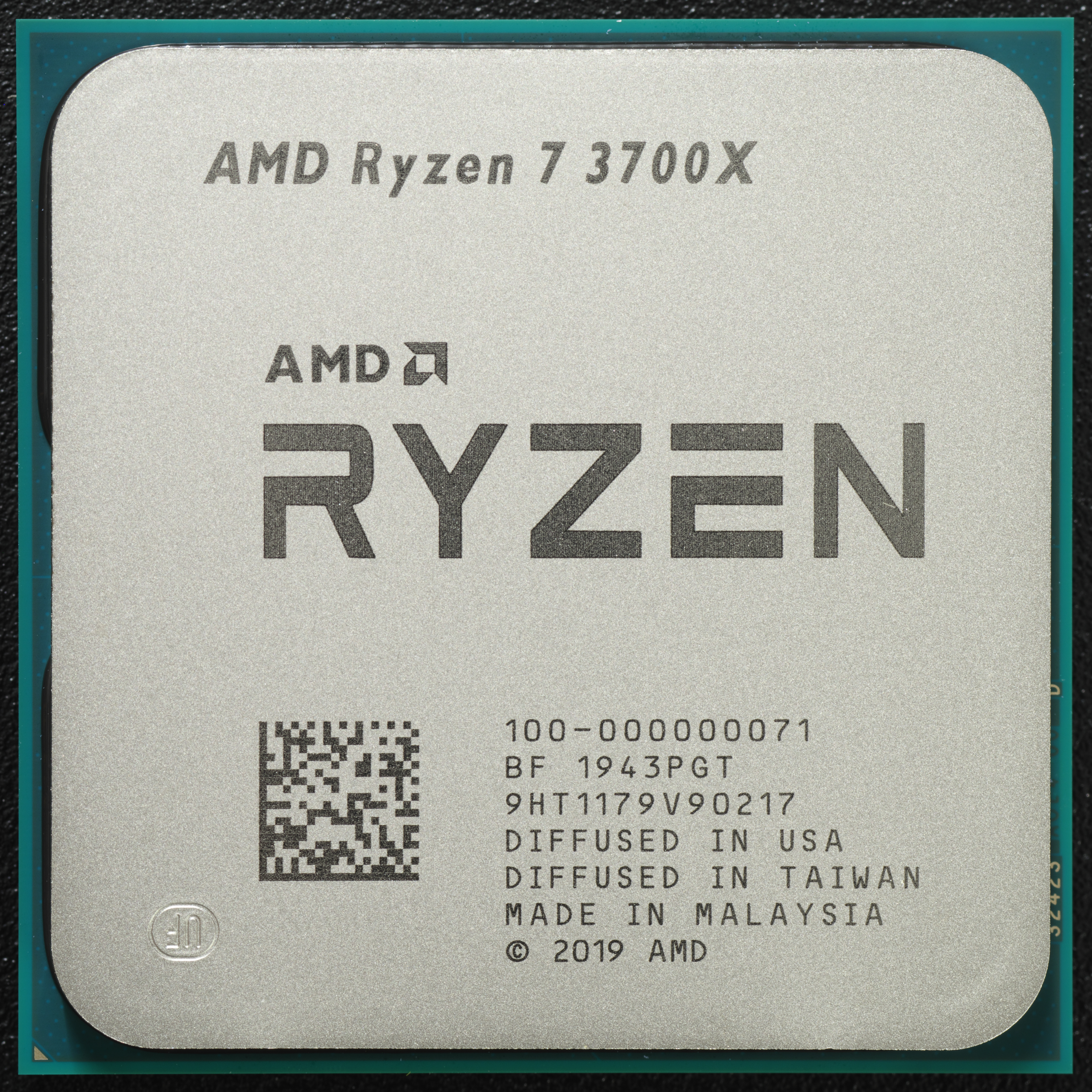
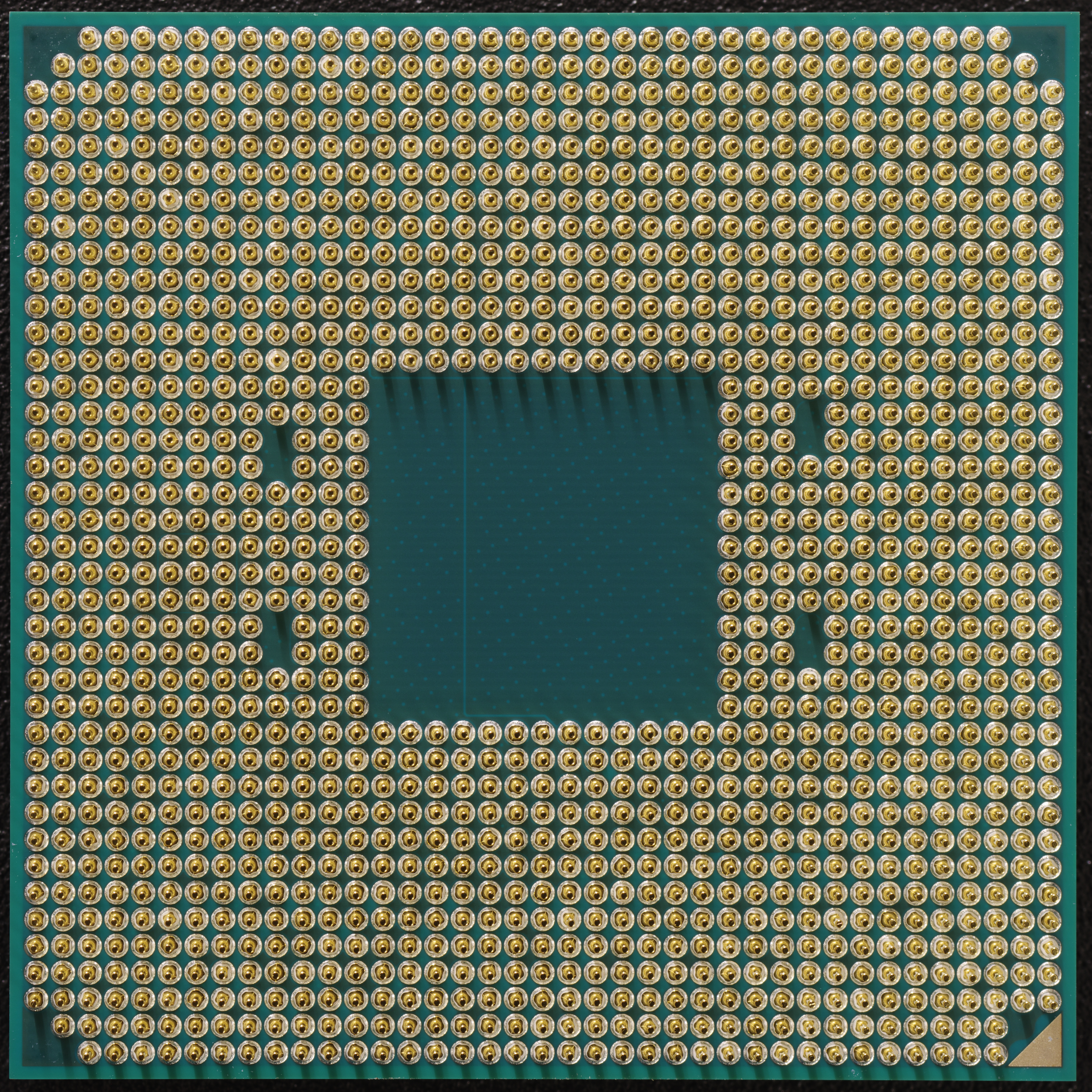
AMD Ryzen 7 3700X top and pins

=== Background ===
Ryzen uses the Zen CPU microarchitecture, a redesign that returned AMD to the high-end CPU market after a decade of near-total absence since 2006. AMD's primary competitor, Intel, had largely dominated this market segment starting from the 2006 release of their Core microarchitecture and the Core 2 Duo. Similarly, Intel had abandoned their prior Pentium 4 lineup, as its NetBurst microarchitecture was uncompetitive with AMD's Athlon XP in terms of price and efficiency, and with their Athlon 64 and 64 X2, they were outmatched in terms of raw performance as well.

Until Ryzen's initial launch in early 2017, Intel's market dominance over AMD continued to grow with the launch of the Intel Core CPU lineup and branding, as well as the successful rollout of their now well-known tick-tock CPU release strategy. The strategy was most famous for alternating between a new CPU microarchitecture and a new fabrication node each year. Intel followed that release cadence for almost a decade, starting with Intel's initial Q3 2006 launch of 65 nm Conroe, and continuing until the release of the 14 nm Broadwell desktop CPUs, which were delayed a year from a planned 2014 launch to Q3 2015. The delay necessitated a refresh of their pre-existing 22 nm Haswell CPU lineup in the form of Devil's Canyon, and thus officially ended tick-tock as a practice. The events proved to be incredibly important for AMD, as Intel's inability to further sustain tick-tock was critically important in providing both the initial and continually growing market openings for AMD's Ryzen CPUs, and indeed the Zen CPU microarchitecture as a whole to succeed.

Also of note is the release of AMD's Bulldozer microarchitecture in 2011, which, despite being a ground up CPU design like Zen, had been designed and optimized for parallel computing above all else, leading to starkly inferior real-world performance in any workload that was not highly multi-threaded, which was still the case for the vast majority at that time. This caused it to be woefully uncompetitive in essentially every area outside of raw multi-thread performance and its use in low power APUs with integrated Radeon graphics. Despite a die shrink and several revisions of the Bulldozer architecture, performance and power efficiency failed to catch up with Intel's competing products. Consequently, all of this forced AMD to completely abandon the entire high-end CPU market (including desktop, laptops, and server/enterprise) until Ryzen's release in 2017.

Ryzen is the consumer-level implementation of the newer Zen microarchitecture, a complete redesign that marked the return of AMD to the high-end central processing unit (CPU) market, offering a product range capable of competing with Intel. Having more processing cores, Ryzen processors offer greater multi-threaded performance at the same price point relative to Intel's Core processors. The Zen architecture delivers more than 52% improvement in instructions per cycle (clock) over the prior-generation Bulldozer AMD core, without raising electrical power use.

Since the release of Ryzen, AMD's CPU market share has increased while Intel's appears to have stagnated or regressed.

=== Release ===
AMD announced a new series of processors on December 13, 2016, named Ryzen, and delivered them in Q1 2017, the first of several generations. The 1000 series featured up to eight cores and sixteen threads, with a 52% instructions per cycle (IPC) increase over their prior CPU products, namely AMD's previous Excavator microarchitecture.

The second generation of Ryzen processors, the Ryzen 2000 series, released in April 2018, featured the Zen+ microarchitecture. The aggregate performance increased 10% (of which approximately 3% was IPC and 6% was clock frequency). Most importantly, Zen+ fixed the cache and memory latencies that had been major weak points.

The third generation of Ryzen processors launched on July 7, 2019, based on AMD's Zen 2 architecture, featuring significant design improvements with a 15% average IPC boost, a doubling of floating point capability to a full 256-bit-wide execution data path much like Intel's Haswell released in 2014, a shift to an multi-chip module (MCM) style chiplet package design, and a further shrink to Taiwan Semiconductor Manufacturing Company (TSMC)'s 7 nm fabrication process.

On June 16, 2020, AMD announced new Ryzen 3000XT series processors with increased boost clocks and other small performance enhancements compared to 3000X processors.

On October 8, 2020, AMD announced the Zen 3 architecture for their Ryzen 5000 series processors, featuring a 19% IPC improvement over Zen 2, while being built on the same 7 nm TSMC node with out-of-the-box operating boost frequencies exceeding 5 GHz for the first time since AMD's Piledriver. This was followed by an unusually short stop-gap release of Ryzen 6000 mobile-only series processors on January 4, 2022, using the modestly changed Zen 3+ core on a 6 nm process by TSMC, with claims up to 15% performance uplift gains from frequency rather than IPC.

The Ryzen 7000 series was released September 27, 2022 for desktops, featuring the new Zen 4 core with a 13% uplift in IPC and 15% increase in frequency for a claimed nearly 30% in single thread performance. The Ryzen 7000 series also features a brand new AM5 socket and uses DDR5 memory.

== Threadripper series ==
Threadripper, which is geared for high-end desktops (HEDT) and professional workstations, was not developed as part of a business plan or a specific roadmap. Instead, a small team inside AMD saw an opportunity to develop the benefits of Ryzen and EPYC CPU roadmaps, so as to give AMD the lead in desktop CPU performance. After some progress was made in their spare time, the project was greenlit and put in an official roadmap by 2016.

== Ryzen AI ==
Ryzen AI is the brand name for AMD's AI technology, based on intellectual property from AMD's acquisition of Xilinx. AMD Ryzen AI can work across a neural processing unit (NPU) powered by XDNA architecture, based on AI engines, a Radeon graphics engine, and Ryzen processor cores. Introduced on the Ryzen 7040 mobile series in mid 2023, it can be used to run neural network applications such as camera background effects, voice recognition, photo artifact removal and skin smoothing. Neural network tasks can be computationally intensive to run on a general-purpose CPU, resulting in significant energy usage and a larger thermal footprint. An AI accelerator is a coprocessor specifically designed to process neural networks efficiently, similar in concept to other work-offloading specialized processing units such as video decoders or FPGAs.

Software support for Microsoft Windows was made widely available in December 2023, while software support for Linux was introduced in January 2024.

== Product lineup ==
=== Ryzen 1000 ===
==== Desktop ====
- Socket AM4 for Ryzen and Socket TR4 for Ryzen Threadripper.
- Based on first generation Zen. Ryzen CPUs based on Summit Ridge architecture. Threadripper based on Whitehaven architecture.
- 4.8 billion transistors per 192 mm^{2} 8-core "Zeppelin" die with one die being used for Ryzen and two for Ryzen Threadripper.
- Stepping: B1
- Memory support:
  - Ryzen dual-channel: DDR4–2666 ×2 single rank, DDR4–2400 ×2 dual rank, DDR4–2133 ×4 single rank, or DDR4–1866 ×4 dual rank.
  - Ryzen Threadripper quad-channel: DDR4–2666 ×4 single rank, DDR4–2400 ×4 dual rank, DDR4–2133 ×8 single rank, or DDR4–1866 ×8 dual rank.
- Instructions sets: x87, MMX, SSE, SSE2, SSE3, SSSE3, SSE4.1, SSE4.2, AES, CLMUL, AVX, AVX2, FMA3, CVT16/F16C, ABM, BMI1, BMI2, SHA.
- All Ryzen-branded CPUs (except PRO variants) feature unlocked multipliers.
- AMD's SenseMI Technology monitors the processor continuously and uses Infinity Control Fabric to offer the following features:
  - Pure Power reduces the entire ramp of processor voltage and clock speed, for light loads.
  - Precision Boost increases the processor voltage and clock speed by 100–200 MHz if three or more cores are active (five or more, in the case of Threadripper, and by 300 MHz); and significantly further when less than three are active (less than five, in the case of Threadripper).
  - XFR (eXtended Frequency Range) aims to maintain the average clock speed closer to the maximum Precision Boost, when sufficient cooling is available.
  - Neural Net Prediction and Smart Prefetch use perceptron based neural branch prediction inside the processor to optimize instruction workflow and cache management.
- Ryzen launched in conjunction with a line of stock coolers for Socket AM4: the Wraith Stealth, Wraith Spire and Wraith Max. This line succeeds the original AMD Wraith cooler, which was released in mid-2016. The Wraith Stealth is a bundled low-profile unit meant for the lower-end CPUs with a rating for a TDP of 65 W, whereas the Wraith Spire is the bundled mainstream cooler with a TDP rating of 95 W, along with optional RGB lighting on certain models. The Wraith Max is a larger cooler incorporating heatpipes, rated at 140 W TDP.
- In December 2019, AMD started producing first generation Ryzen products built using the second generation Zen+ architecture. An example is the Ryzen 5 1600, with new batches having an "AF" identifier instead of its usual "AE", essentially being an underbinned Ryzen 5 2600 with the same specifications as the original Ryzen 5 1600.

Overview of desktop Ryzen 1000 series models
Model line	Codename	Architecture	Core count	Integrated graphics
Ryzen Threadripper 1000	Whitehaven	Zen (1st gen)	8–16	none
Ryzen 1000 / 1000X	Summit Ridge	Zen (1st gen)	4–8	none
Ryzen 1000 (AF)	Pinnacle Ridge	Zen+	4–6	none

=== Ryzen 2000 ===
==== Desktop ====
The first Ryzen 2000 CPUs, based on the 12 nm Zen+ microarchitecture, were announced for preorder on April 13, 2018 and launched six days later. Zen+ based Ryzen CPUs are based on Pinnacle Ridge architecture, while Threadripper CPUs are based on the Colfax architecture. The first of the 2000 series of Ryzen Threadripper products, introducing Precision Boost Overdrive technology, followed in August. The Ryzen 7 2700X was bundled with the new Wraith Prism cooler.

In January 2018, AMD announced the first two Ryzen desktop APUs with integrated Radeon Vega graphics under the Raven Ridge codename. These are based on first generation Zen architecture. The Ryzen 3 2200G and the Ryzen 5 2400G were released in February.

Overview of desktop Ryzen 2000 series models
Model line	Codename	Architecture	Core count	Integrated graphics
Ryzen Threadripper 2000	Colfax	Zen+	12–32	none
Ryzen 2000 / 2000X	Pinnacle Ridge	Zen+	4–8	none
Ryzen 2000G	Raven Ridge	Zen (1st gen)	4	Radeon Vega (GCN 5), up to 11 CU

==== Mobile ====
In May 2017, AMD demonstrated a Ryzen mobile APU with four Zen CPU cores and Radeon Vega GPU. The first Ryzen mobile APUs, codenamed Raven Ridge, were officially released in October 2017.

- 4.95 billion transistors on a 210 mm^{2} die, based on a modified 14 nm Zeppelin die where four of the cores are replaced by an integrated fifth-generation GCN-based GPU.
- Precision Boost 2
- 16 external PCIe 3.0 lanes (four each to chipset and M.2 socket; eight to a PCIe slot). In 2019, AMD released some new dual core Zen mobile parts branded as 300 or 3000, codenamed Dali.

Overview of laptop Ryzen 2000 series models
Model line	Codename	Architecture	Core count	Integrated graphics
Ryzen 2000	Raven Ridge	Zen (1st gen)	2–4	Radeon Vega (GCN 5), up to 11 CU

==== Embedded ====
===== Great Horned Owl =====
In February 2018 AMD announced the V1000 series of embedded Zen+ Vega APUs, based on the Great Horned Owl architecture, with four SKUs.

===== Banded Kestrel =====
In April 2019 AMD announced another line of embedded Zen+ Vega APUs, namely the Ryzen Embedded R1000 series with two SKUs.

=== Ryzen 3000 ===
==== Desktop ====
On May 27, 2019 at Computex in Taipei, AMD launched its third generation Ryzen processors which use AMD's Zen 2 architecture. For this generation's microarchitectures, Ryzen uses Matisse, while Threadripper uses Castle Peak. The chiplet design separates the CPU cores, fabricated on TSMC's 7FF process, and the I/O, fabricated on GlobalFoundries' 12LP process, and connects them via Infinity Fabric. The Ryzen 3000 series uses the AM4 socket similar to earlier models and is the first CPU to offer PCI Express 4.0 (PCIe) connectivity. The new architecture offers a 15% instruction-per-clock (IPC) uplift and a reduction in energy usage. Other improvements include a doubling of the L3 cache size, a re-optimized L1 instruction cache, a larger micro-operations cache, double the AVX/AVX2 bandwidth, improved branch prediction, and better instruction pre-fetching. The 6, 8 and 12 core CPUs became generally available on July 7, 2019, and 24 core processors were launched in November.

The competing Intel Core i9-10980XE processor has only 18 cores and 36 threads. Another competitor, the workstation-oriented Intel Xeon W-3275 and W-3275M, has 28 cores, 56 threads, and cost more when launched.

The 4, 6 and 8 core processors have one core chiplet. The 12 and 16 core processors have two core chiplets. In all cases the I/O die is the same.

The Threadripper 24 and 32 core processors have four core chiplets. The 64 core processor has eight core chiplets. All Threadripper processors use the same I/O die.

Desktop and mobile APUs are based on the Picasso microarchitecture, a 12 nm refresh of Raven Ridge, offering a modest 6% increase in clock speeds (up to an additional 300 MHz maximum boost), Precision Boost 2, an increase of up to 3% in IPC from the move to the Zen+ core with its reduced cache and memory latencies, and newly added solder thermal interface material for the desktop parts. Fabricated at GlobalFoundries, this gives Picasso an aggregate 10% performance uplift from the "original" 14 nm Zen-based Raven Ridge series initially released in 2017.

Overview of desktop Ryzen 3000 series models
Model line	Codename	Architecture	Core count	Integrated graphics
Ryzen Threadripper PRO 3000	Castle Peak	Zen 2	12–64	none
Ryzen Threadripper 3000	Castle Peak	Zen 2	24–64	none
Ryzen 3000 / 3000X	Matisse	Zen 2	4–16	none
Ryzen 3000G	Picasso	Zen+	4	Radeon Vega (GCN 5), up to 11 CU

==== Mobile ====
In 2019, AMD first released the Ryzen 3000 APUs, consisting only of quad core parts. Then in January 2020, they announced value dual-core mobile parts, codenamed Dalí, including the Ryzen 3 3250U and lower-end Athlon-branded parts.

Overview of laptop Ryzen 3000 series models
Model line	Codename	Architecture	Core count	Integrated graphics
Ryzen 3000	Picasso	Zen+	2–4	Radeon Vega (GCN 5), up to 11 CU
Ryzen 3 3250U, Ryzen 3 3200U	Dali	Zen (1st gen)	2	Radeon Vega (GCN 5), 3 CU

=== Ryzen 4000 ===
==== Desktop ====
The Ryzen 4000 APUs are based on Renoir, a refresh of the Zen 2 Matisse CPU cores, coupled with Radeon Vega GPU cores. They were released only to OEM manufacturers in mid-2020. Unlike Matisse, Renoir does not support PCIe 4.0.

Ryzen PRO 4x50G APUs are the same as 4x00G APUs, except they are bundled a Wraith Stealth cooler and are not OEM-only. It is possible this is a listing mistake, since 4x50G CPUs are unavailable on retail (as of Oct 2020) and PRO SKUs are usually the OEM only parts.

In April 2022, AMD released the Ryzen 5 4600G to retail, and launched the Ryzen 4000 series of CPUs without integrated graphics, for budget-oriented users. Unlike the Ryzen 3000 series CPUs which are based on "Matisse" cores, these new Ryzen 4000 series desktop CPUs are based on "Renoir" cores and are essentially APUs with the integrated graphics disabled.

Overview of desktop Ryzen 4000 series models
Model line	Codename	Architecture	Core count	Integrated graphics
Ryzen 4000	Renoir	Zen 2	4–6	none
Ryzen 4000G	Renoir	Zen 2	4–8	Radeon Vega (GCN 5), up to 8 CU

==== Mobile ====
Zen 2 APUs, based on the 7 nm Renoir microarchitecture, commercialized as Ryzen 4000.

Overview of laptop Ryzen 4000 series models
Model line	Codename	Architecture	Core count	Integrated graphics
Ryzen 4000	Renoir	Zen 2	4–8	Radeon Vega (GCN 5), up to 8 CU

==== Embedded ====
===== Grey Hawk =====
In November 2020, AMD announced the V2000 series of embedded Zen 2 Vega APUs.

=== Ryzen 5000 ===
==== Desktop ====
The desktop Ryzen 5000 series, based on the Zen 3 microarchitecture, was announced on October 8, 2020. They use the same 7 nm manufacturing process, which has matured slightly. Mainstream Ryzen 5000 CPUs are codenamed Vermeer. Enthusiast/workstation Threadripper 5000 CPUs are codenamed Chagall, initially named Ryzen Threadripper 4000 under the codename Genesis.

In contrast to their CPU counterparts, the APUs consist of single dies with integrated graphics and smaller caches. The APUs, codenamed Cezanne, forgo PCIe 4.0 support to keep power consumption low.

Overview of desktop Ryzen 5000 series models
Model line	Codename	Architecture	Core count	Integrated graphics
Ryzen Threadripper PRO 5000	Chagall	Zen 3	12–64	none
Ryzen 5000 / 5000X / 5000X3D	Vermeer	Zen 3	6–16	none
Ryzen 5000G	Cezanne	Zen 3	4–8	Radeon Vega (GCN 5), up to 8 CU
Ryzen 7 5700	Cezanne	Zen 3	4–8	
Ryzen 5 5500	Cezanne	Zen 3	4–8	
Ryzen 3 5100	Cezanne	Zen 3	4–8	

==== Mobile ====
The 5000 series includes models based on the Zen 2 microarchitecture (codename Lucienne) and Zen 3 microarchitecture. The codenames of the Zen 3-based mobile APUs are Cezanne for the 2021 models and Barceló for the 2022 models. HX models are unlocked, allowing them to be overclocked if the host device manufacturer has exposed that functionality. Simultaneous multithreading (SMT) is now standard across the lineup unlike the 4000-series Ryzen Mobile.

Overview of laptop Ryzen 5000 series models
Model line	Codename	Architecture	Core count	Integrated graphics
Ryzen 7 5700U, Ryzen 5 5500U, Ryzen 3 5300U	Lucienne	Zen 2	4–8	Radeon Vega (GCN 5), up to 8 CU
Ryzen 5000	Cezanne	Zen 3	4–8	Radeon Vega (GCN 5), up to 8 CU
Ryzen 5000	Barcelo	Zen 3	2–8	Radeon Vega (GCN 5), up to 8 CU

=== Ryzen 6000 ===
==== Mobile ====
At CES 2022, AMD announced the Ryzen 6000 mobile series. It is based on the Zen 3+ architecture, which is Zen 3 on 6 nm with efficiency improvements, and is codenamed Rembrandt. Other noteworthy upgrades are RDNA2 based graphics, PCIe 4.0 and DDR5/LPDDR5 support. Ryzen PRO versions of these processors were announced on April 19, 2022 and use a 6x50 naming scheme.

Overview of laptop Ryzen 6000 series models
Model line	Codename	Architecture	Core count	Integrated graphics
Ryzen 6000	Rembrandt	Zen 3+	6–8	Radeon 6x0M (RDNA 2), up to 12 CU

=== Ryzen 7000 ===
==== Desktop ====
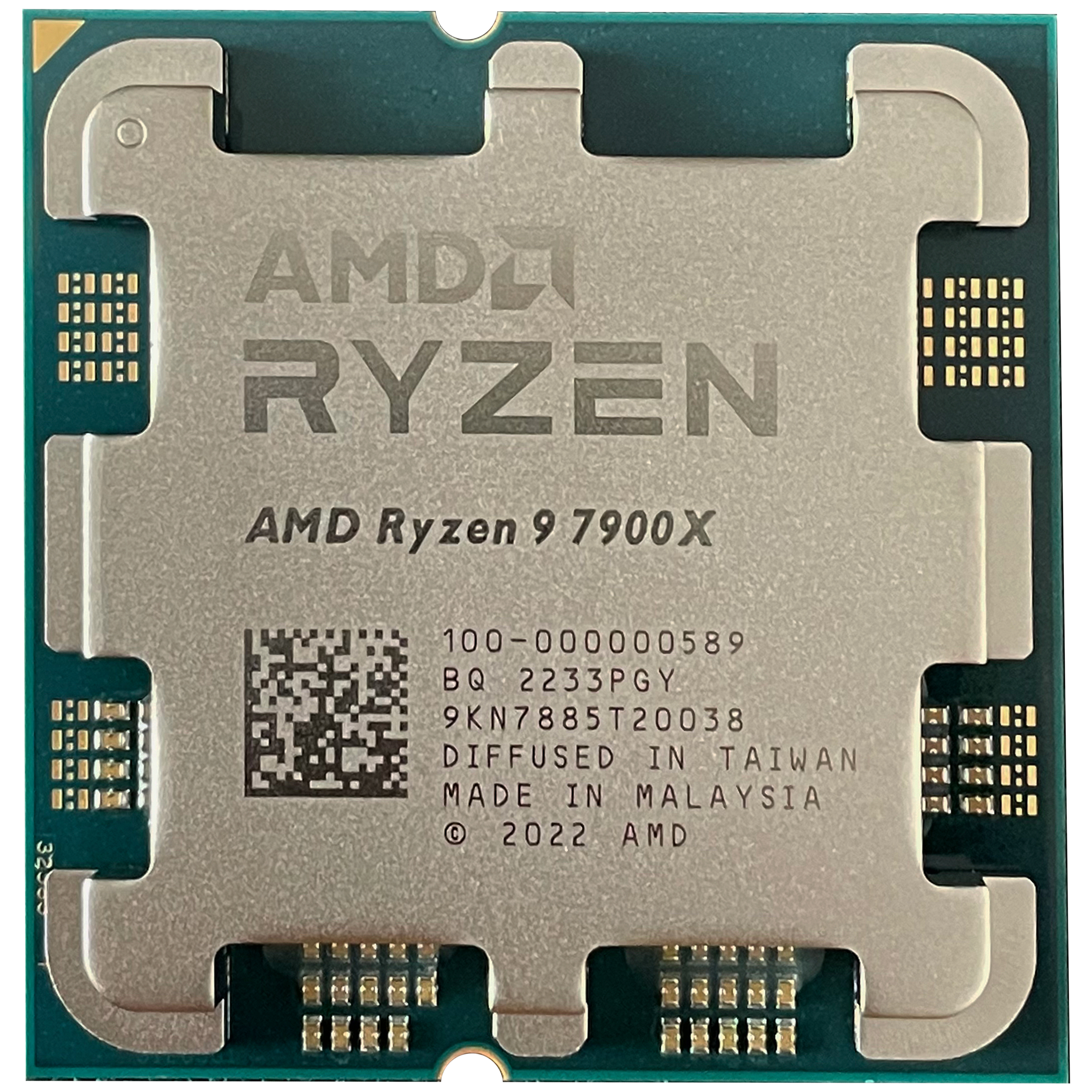
AMD Ryzen 9 7900X processor

In May 2022 AMD revealed its roadmap showing the Ryzen 7000 series of processors for release later that year, to be based on the Zen 4 architecture in 5 nm (codenamed Raphael). Included are DDR5 and PCIe 5.0 support as well as the change to the new AM5 socket. On May 23, 2022 at AMD's Computex keynote, AMD officially announced the Ryzen 7000 to be released in Fall 2022, showing a 16-core CPU reaching boost speeds of 5.5 GHz and claiming a 15% increase in single-thread performance. The initial four models of the Ryzen 7000 series, ranging from Ryzen 5 7600X to Ryzen 9 7950X, were launched on September 27, 2022.

The L2 cache per core is doubled to 1 MB from Zen 3. The I/O die has moved from a 12 nm process to 6 nm and incorporates an integrated RDNA 2 GPU with two CUs on all Ryzen 7000 models (except the Ryzen 5 7500F), as well as DDR5 and PCIe 5.0 support. DDR4 memory is not supported on Ryzen 7000. According to Gamers Nexus, AMD said that the RDNA GPU was intended for diagnostic and office purposes without using a discrete GPU and not for gaming. The operating power of AM5 is increased to 170 W from AM4's 105 W, with the absolute maximum power draw or "Power Package Tracking" (PPT) being 230 W.

The Ryzen Threadripper and Threadripper PRO 7000 series were released on November 21, 2023. Threadripper features up to 64 cores, while Threadripper PRO 7000 features up to 96 cores. These new HEDT and workstation processor lineups both utilize a new socket, sTR5, as well as DDR5 and PCIe 5.0. Two new chipsets have been introduced for the sTR5 socket: TRX50 and WRX90.

In conversations with Gamers Nexus regarding the later Ryzen 7 9800X3D, AMD engineers revealed that in 7000X3D series processors, the 1st-generation V-Cache and accompanying structural silicon above the cores effectively act as a thermal insulator, thus inhibiting cooling of the cores. The cores running hotter thus limited the clock frequencies of 7000X3D series processors, compared to their non-X3D counterparts. The engineers refuted earlier speculation that the temperature of the V-Cache had instead been the limiting factor.

Overview of desktop Ryzen 7000 series models
Model line	Codename	Architecture	Core count	Integrated graphics
Ryzen Threadripper PRO 7000	Storm Peak	Zen 4	12–96	none
Ryzen Threadripper 7000	Storm Peak	Zen 4	24–64	none
Ryzen 7000 / 7000X / 7000X3D	Raphael	Zen 4	6–16	Radeon (RDNA 2), 2 CU

==== Mobile ====
The Ryzen 7000 mobile series initially launched in September 2022 with the Ryzen 7020 Mendocino line of low-end Zen 2 ultra mobile processors.

In early 2023, the rest of the Ryzen 7000 mobile lineup was released, starting with Ryzen 7030, Ryzen 7035, and later Ryzen 7045 and Ryzen 7040 series processors.

The Ryzen 7020 series targets the "everyday computing" segment. It is a new Zen 2 design based on 6 nm process and RDNA 2 integrated graphics.

The Ryzen 7030 series is a refresh of Ryzen 5000 series processors codenamed "Barcelo-R", targeting the "mainstream thin-and-light" segment.

The Ryzen 7035 series is a refresh of Ryzen 6000 series processors codenamed "Rembrandt-R", targeting "premium thin-and-light" laptops.

The Ryzen 7040 series is a new design based on Zen 4, targeting "elite ultrathin" segment. It integrates a built-in AI accelerator (branded as "Ryzen AI") for the first time in an x86 processor, and features RDNA 3 integrated graphics with up to 12 compute units.

The Ryzen 7045 series is the top of the range, based on Zen 4. It targets "extreme gaming and creator" laptops, i.e. desktop replacement class laptops, with models providing up to 16 cores. It uses a chiplet package built using a separate CCD (Core Complex Die, containing processor cores) and I/OD (Input/Output Die), the same as those used in Raphael desktop processors.

Altogether, there are four different CPU architectures, and three different GPU architectures used across the various models in the 7000 series lineup.

With the launch of the mobile Ryzen 7000 series, a new CPU model naming system was also introduced, which is used with Ryzen and Athlon mobile processors launching from this point onwards, as follows:

Ryzen/Athlon xabc:

- x – timeline of creation (7 for 2022, 8 for 2023, etc)
- a – performance segment (1 for low end, 7 for high-end, 9 for enthusiast, etc)
- b – Microarchitecture the processor is based on (1 for Zen / Zen+, 3 for Zen 3 / 3+, 4 for Zen 4, 5 for Zen 5, etc)
- c – feature / minor performance segment (0 for lower segment, 5 for higher segment)

The new naming system has drawn criticism for being overly complex and confusing to consumers. Desktop processors continue to use the old naming system.

Overview of laptop Ryzen 7000 series models
Model line	Codename	Architecture	Core count	Integrated graphics
Ryzen 7045	Dragon Range	Zen 4	6–16	Radeon 610M (RDNA 2), 2 CU
Ryzen 7040	Phoenix	Zen 4	4–8	Radeon 7x0M (RDNA 3), up to 12 CU
Ryzen 7035	Rembrandt-R	Zen 3+	4–8	Radeon 6x0M (RDNA 2), up to 12 CU
Ryzen 7030	Barcelo-R	Zen 3	4–8	Radeon Vega (GCN 5), up to 8 CU
Ryzen 7020	Mendocino	Zen 2	2–4	Radeon 610M (RDNA 2), 2 CU

=== Ryzen Z1 ===
==== Handheld ====
On April 25, 2023, AMD announced the Ryzen Z1 series of APUs for "handheld PC gaming consoles", and announced that the Asus ROG Ally would use the Ryzen Z1 Extreme processor. AMD promised compatibility with Windows 11, among other operating systems.

Overview of handheld Ryzen Z1 series models
Model line	Architecture	Core count	Integrated graphics
Ryzen Z1	Zen 4	6-8	RDNA 3, 4–12 CU

=== Ryzen 8000 ===
==== Desktop ====
On January 8, 2024, AMD announced the Ryzen 8000G series of desktop APUs for the AM5 socket at the 2024 Consumer Electronics Show. These APUs are based on Zen 4 and feature up to 12 CUs of RDNA3 integrated graphics. Furthermore, the upper-end models such as Ryzen 5 8600G and Ryzen 7 8700G feature "Ryzen AI", which is a neural processing unit (NPU) for artificial intelligence PC applications. AMD claims that the integrated graphics in Ryzen 8000G APUs is capable of playing AAA games such as Cyberpunk 2077 and Far Cry 6 at 1080p low settings.

On April 1, 2024, AMD quietly released Ryzen 8000 series processors without integrated graphics, which also use the Zen 4 architecture. These processors are essentially based on the Ryzen 8000G series but with the integrated graphics and NPU disabled. The Ryzen 7 8700F however can provide AI acceleration when paired with a Radeon discrete GPU that supports it.

Overview of desktop Ryzen 8000 series models
Model line	Codename	Architecture	Core count	Integrated graphics
Ryzen 8000	Phoenix	Zen 4	6–8	none
Ryzen 8000G	Phoenix	Zen 4	4–8	Radeon 7x0M (RDNA 3), up to 12 CU

==== Mobile ====
A refresh of Ryzen 7040 mobile processors named the Ryzen 8040 and 8045 series were announced on December 6, 2023. These processors feature small firmware and software optimizations for performance and have up to 60% faster NPU performance (6 TOPS higher) compared to Ryzen 7040. A refresh of the Dragon Range series was added on April 10, 2025, primarily featuring minor clock speed adjustments.

Overview of mobile Ryzen 8000 series models
Model line	Codename	Architecture	Core count	Integrated graphics
Ryzen 8045HS; Ryzen 8040HS	Hawk Point	Zen 4	4–8	Radeon 7x0M (RDNA 3), up to 12 CU
Ryzen 8045HX	Dragon Range Refresh	Zen 4	8–16	Radeon 610M (RDNA 2), 2 CU

=== Ryzen 9000 ===
==== Desktop ====
The Ryzen 9000 series of desktop processors, codenamed "Granite Ridge", were announced on June 3, 2024 at a Computex presentation. Utilizing the Zen 5 microarchitecture and built on a TSMC 4 nm process, Granite Ridge features up to 16 cores, uses the AM5 socket and has the same up-to-two-CCDs and one I/O die chiplet layout as the direct predecessor line of CPUs, Raphael. The initial lineup consists of four models with no 3D V-Cache variants, like with the Ryzen 7000 series at launch. Ryzen 9000 processors were originally scheduled to launch at the end of July 2024, but had been delayed to early August for quality control reasons.

On October 21, AMD teased that it would launch X3D model(s) (featuring 3D V-Cache) in the series on November 7. On October 31, AMD announced it would release a Ryzen 7 9800X3D processor. The 9800X3D will feature 2nd-generation 3D V-Cache, wherein the V-Cache has been moved from above the CCD to below the CCD. This change is claimed to lower the CCD temperature, thus allowing for higher clock frequencies. Originally, 9000 series X3D models had been expected to arrive in January 2025.

On January 6, 2025, AMD announced that it would release 9900X3D and 9950X3D desktop processors in Q1 2025. The models will have 2 CCDs, only one of which will feature 2nd-generation 3D V-Cache.

In January 2025, AMD stated that there were no technical barriers to adding 2nd-generation 3D V-Cache to both CCDs of a CPU. However, internal testing led them to conclude that games would not benefit enough from such configurations, making them economically infeasible; and thus AMD declined to launch dual 3D V-Cache variants of their CPUs at the time. However, AMD later released a dual 3D V-Cache CPU in the form of the Ryzen 9 9950X3D2 Dual Edition on April 22, 2026.

Overview of desktop Ryzen 9000 series models
Model line	Codename	Architecture	Core count	Integrated graphics
Ryzen 9000 / 9000X / 9000X3D / 9000X3D2	Granite Ridge	Zen 5	6–16	Radeon (RDNA 2), 2 CU

==== Mobile ====
The Ryzen 9000 series of mobile processors, codenamed "Fire Range", were announced on January 6, 2025 at CES.

Overview of mobile Ryzen 9000 series models
Model line	Codename	Architecture	Core count	Integrated graphics
Ryzen 9000HX / 9000HX3D	Fire Range	Zen 5	12–16	Radeon (RDNA 2), 2 CU

=== Ryzen AI 300 ===
==== Mobile ====
Alongside the Ryzen 9000 desktop series, AMD also introduced the Ryzen AI 300 series of elite ultrathin mobile processors codenamed "Strix Point" on June 3, 2024 at Computex. It features up to 12 cores, a third-generation Ryzen AI NPU based on XDNA 2 and up to 16 compute units (CUs) of RDNA 3.5 integrated graphics. The NPU provides up to 50 TOPS for AI inference processing. These new processors also deviate from the naming scheme used with Ryzen 7000 and 8000 series mobile processors, instead using a three-digit model numbering system similar to Intel's Core and Core Ultra 3/5/7/9 series. AMD has allegedly decided not to introduce a whole range of SKUs that previously existed, namely U (ultra-low power) and H(S) (high performance) models and instead OEMs are now allowed to configure the APU thermals as they see fit ranging from 15 to 54 W.

The codename "Krackan Point" and high-end codename "Strix Halo" additions to the 300 series were announced on January 6, 2025 at CES.

Overview of mobile Ryzen AI 300 series models
Model line	Codename	Architecture	Core count	Integrated graphics
Ryzen AI 300	Strix Point	Zen 5 Zen 5c	10–12	Radeon 8x0M (RDNA 3.5), up to 16 CU
Ryzen AI 7 350, Ryzen AI 5 340	Krackan Point	Zen 5 Zen 5c	6–8	Radeon 8x0M (RDNA 3.5), up to 8 CU
Ryzen AI MAX+ 395, Ryzen AI MAX 390, Ryzen AI MAX 385, Ryzen AI MAX 380	Strix Halo	Zen 5	6–16	Radeon 80x0S (RDNA 3.5), up to 40 CU

=== Ryzen 200 ===
==== Mobile ====
The Ryzen 200 series of mobile processors, codenamed "Hawk Point Refresh", were announced on January 6, 2025 at CES.

Overview of mobile Ryzen 200 series models
Model line	Codename	Architecture
Ryzen 200	Hawk Point Refresh	Zen 4 Zen 4c

=== Ryzen Z2 ===
==== Mobile ====
On January 6, 2025, AMD announced the Ryzen Z2 series of APUs at CES, as a sequel to its previous Ryzen Z1 series; at launch they included three models, the hexa-core Z2 and Z2 Extreme (which use the Zen 4 and Zen 5 architectures respectively), and the quad-core Z2 Go, which is based on Zen 3, and exclusive to the Lenovo Legion Go S handheld. In June 2025, AMD announced two additional Z2 models, the Ryzen AI Z2 Extreme (which adds a neural processing unit) and the low-end, Zen 2-based Ryzen Z2 A.

Overview of handheld Ryzen Z2 series models
Model line	Architecture	Core count	Integrated graphics
Ryzen AI Z2 Extreme	Zen 5	8–16	RDNA 3.5, 16 CU
Ryzen Z2 Extreme	Zen 5	8–16	RDNA 3.5, 16 CU
Ryzen Z2	Zen 4	8–16	RDNA 3, 12 CU
Ryzen Z2 Go	Zen 3+	4–8	RDNA 2, 12 CU
Ryzen Z2 A	Zen 2	4–8	RDNA 2, 8 CU

== Initial reception ==
The first Ryzen 7 (1700, 1700X, and 1800X) processors debuted in early March 2017 and were generally well received by hardware reviewers. Ryzen was the first brand new architecture from AMD in five years, and without very much initial fine-tuning or optimization, it ran generally well for reviewers. Initial Ryzen chips ran well with software and games already on the market, performing exceptionally well in workstation scenarios, and well in most gaming scenarios. Compared to Piledriver-powered FX chips, Zen-powered Ryzen chips ran cooler, much faster, and used less power. IPC uplift was eventually gauged to be 52% higher than Excavator, which was two full generations ahead of the architecture still being used in AMD's FX-series desktop predecessors like the FX-8350 and FX-8370. Though Zen fell short of Intel's Kaby Lake in terms of IPC, and therefore single-threaded throughput, it compensated by offering more cores to applications that can use them. Power consumption and heat emission were found to be competitive with Intel, and the included Wraith coolers were generally competitive with higher-priced aftermarket units.

Ryzen 7 1800X's multi-threaded performance, in some cases while using Blender or other open-source software, was around four times the performance of the FX-8370, or nearly double that of the Core i7-7700K. One reviewer found that Ryzen chips would usually outperform competing Intel's Core i7 processors for a fraction of the price when all eight cores are used.

However, one complaint among a subset of reviewers was that Ryzen processors lagged behind their Intel counterparts when running older games, or some newer games at mainstream resolutions such as 720p or 1080p. AMD acknowledged the gaming performance deficit at low resolutions during a Reddit "Ask Me Anything" thread, where it explained that updates and patches were being developed. Subsequent updates to Ashes of the Singularity: Escalation and Rise of the Tomb Raider increased frame rates by 17-31% on Ryzen systems. In April 2017, developer id Software announced that, in the future, its games would exploit the greater parallelism available on Ryzen CPUs.

It has been suggested that low threaded applications often result in Ryzen processors being underused, yielding lower than expected benchmark scores, because Zen relies on its core count to make up for its lower IPC rating than that of Kaby Lake. However, AMD and others have argued thread scheduling is not the fundamental issue to Windows 10 performance.

== Operating system support ==
=== Windows ===
AMD verified that computers with Ryzen CPUs can boot Windows 7 and Windows 8 both 64- and 32-bit. However, newer hardware including AMD Ryzen and Intel Kaby Lake and later is only officially supported by Microsoft with the use of Windows 10. Windows Update blocks updates from being installed on newer systems running older versions of Windows, though that restriction can be circumvented with an unofficial patch. Windows 11 is only officially supported on Ryzen APUs and CPUs using Zen+ architecture or newer; systems running Zen architecture-based CPUs or APUs are not entitled to receive updates.

Although AMD initially announced that Ryzen chipset drivers would not be provided for Windows 7, its chipset driver packages do in fact list and include them.

For Ryzen product line, AMD does not provide official supports and official drivers for Windows Server operating systems.

=== Linux ===
Full support for Ryzen processors' performance features in Linux required kernel version 4.10 (released February 2017) or newer.

== Known issues ==
=== Spectre ===
Like nearly all modern high performance microprocessors, Ryzen was susceptible to the "Spectre" vulnerabilities. The vulnerabilities can be mitigated without hardware changes via microcode updates and operating system workarounds, but the mitigations incur a performance penalty. Ryzen and Epyc suffer up to 20% penalty from the mitigations, depending on workload, comparing favorably with a penalty of in some benchmarks up to 30% for Intel Core and Xeon processors, in part as a result of the AMD processors not requiring mitigation against the related Meltdown vulnerability.

Launched in 2019, Zen 2 includes hardware mitigations against the Spectre V4 speculative store bypass vulnerability.

=== Segmentation fault ===
Some early shipments of Ryzen 1000 series processors produced segmentation faults on some workloads on Linux, especially while compiling code with GNU Compiler Collection (GCC). AMD offered to replace the affected processors with newer ones that are unaffected by the problem.

=== Vulnerabilities from CTS Labs ===
In March 2018, Israeli computer security firm CTS Labs claimed to have discovered major vulnerabilities in the Ryzen chipset's Security Processor. Independent security experts agreed that the flaws were genuine, but that they were not as severe as claimed, requiring local administrator access to exploit. AMD announced firmware updates to handle these flaws. CTS Labs publicized the findings after giving AMD only 24 hours to respond, leading to claims that the flaws were published for the purpose of stock manipulation.

== See also ==
- Athlon
- AMD Accelerated Processing Unit
- List of AMD processors
- List of AMD Athlon processors
- List of AMD Epyc processors
- List of AMD FX processors
- List of AMD Opteron processors
- List of AMD Phenom processors
- List of AMD Ryzen processors
