= Neural Network Exchange Format =

Artificial neural network data exchange format

Neural Network Exchange Format (NNEF)
- Developer(s): Khronos Group
- Stable release: 1.0.5 / February 16, 2022; 3 years ago
- Operating system: Cross-platform
- Platform: Cross-platform
- Type: API
- Website: www.khronos.org/nnef/

Neural Network Exchange Format (NNEF) is an artificial neural network data exchange format developed by the Khronos Group. It is intended to reduce machine learning deployment fragmentation by enabling a rich mix of neural network training tools and inference engines to be used by applications across a diverse range of devices and platforms.

== History ==
NNEF was proposed in 2015 by member companies of the Khronos Group as a device and implementation independent transfer format capable of describing any artificial neural net in terms of its structure, operations and data.

The first version of the standard was launched in provisional form in December 2017, and was ratified as an official Khronos standard in August 2018.

== Objectives ==
The goal of NNEF is to enable data scientists and engineers to easily transfer trained networks from their chosen training framework into a wide variety of inference engines. NNEF encapsulates a complete description of the structure, operations and parameters of a trained neural network, independent of the training tools used to produce it and the inference engine used to execute it.

== Governance and Availability ==
NNEF is maintained by the Khronos Group under its Open Governance Principles as follows:

- Any company is invited and able to join Khronos to contribute to and influence the development of its specifications;
- Finalized specifications are publicly and freely distributed at zero cost from the Khronos web-site;
- Any company can implement a Khronos specification and participating implementers can obtain a trademark license for conformant implementations and pay zero royalties to Khronos participants; and
- Developers may freely use implementations of Khronos specifications.

The NNEF specification is available on the Khronos NNEF registry and tools are available on Github

== Versions ==
- NNEF 1.0 Provisional, Released 20 December 2017.
- NNEF 1.0, Released 13 August 2018
  - NNEF 1.0.1, Released 10 May 2019
  - NNEF 1.0.2, Released 13 July 2019

== Industry Participation ==
The following Khronos members have participated in the NNEF working group:

- AIMotive.
- Advanced Micro Devices.
- Arm Holdings, Ltd.
- Axell
- Axis Communications.
- Cadence
- Ceva
- Codeplay
- Digital Media Professionals
- ETRI
- Huawei
- Intel Corp.
- Imagination technologies
- LG
- Los Alamos National Lab
- LunarG
- Mediatek
- Mentor Graphics
- NXP
- On Semiconductor
- Qualcomm
- The Qt Company
- Renesas
- Samsung
- Silicon Studio
- Socionext
- Sony
- Synopsys
- Texas Instruments
- Think Silicon
- Verisilicon
- Xilinx

== Tools ==
The NNEF tools project on GitHub contains the following open source tools:

- File format Parser
- Bidirectional converters between NNEF and ONNX, Caffe, Caffe2, TensorFlow (python), TensorFlow (protobuf)
- Model zoo: reference collection of models converted to NNEF

== See also ==
- Open Neural Network Exchange
