= FPAA =

FPAA may refer to:

- Fairmount Park Art Association, Philadelphia
- Field-programmable analog array, an integrated device containing and interconnecting between configurable analog blocks
- Film Production Association of Australia, now Screen Producers Australia
