= Field-programmability =

An electronic device or embedded system is said to be field-programmable or in-place programmable if its firmware (stored in non-volatile memory, such as ROM) can be modified "in the field", without disassembling the device or returning it to its manufacturer.

This is often an extremely desirable feature, as it can reduce the cost and turnaround time for replacement of buggy or obsolete firmware. For example, a digital camera vendor could distribute firmware supporting a new image file format by instructing consumers to download a new firmware image to the camera via a USB cable.

== History ==
When a device's firmware is stored in mask ROM or one-time programmable PROM, it cannot be modified without physically replacing the integrated circuit, so such a device cannot be field-programmable in the modern sense. Erasable PROM-based firmware can be erased and reprogrammed, but only after lengthy exposure to a high-intensity ultraviolet light source.

Thus, field-programmable devices were not practical until the invention of EEPROM and flash memory in the 1980s. Early EEPROMs could only be reprogrammed with expensive, dedicated programmer hardware, since they required high voltages (10-20 V, compared to typical 3-5 V logic levels) and there was no standard programming protocol; as a result, field-programming was mostly performed by professional technicians and service engineers. However, as of the early 2000s, many devices were expressly designed to be field-programmed by ordinary consumers. Several developments have made this possible:

- Modern EEPROM and flash devices contain internal charge pumps which eliminate the need for high voltages.
- Most consumers have access to personal computers, which can perform arbitrary programming protocols.
- Ubiquitous Internet access provides a convenient means to rapidly distribute firmware images.

Standard protocols for programming non-volatile memory devices have emerged. For example, JTAG may be used to read and program the EEPROM and Flash chips in many consumer electronics devices. Many such devices include JTAG headers internally for factory programming and quality control, even though no external connector is exposed in the finished product.

== Programmable logic ==
The 1980s saw the introduction of programmable logic devices (PLDs) such as PALs, PLAs, and CPLDs. These are integrated circuits which can implement nearly arbitrary digital logic functions based on firmware-like information stored in non-volatile memory.

Thus, devices containing PLDs may be considered as field-programmable hardware, while EEPROM and flash memory act as storage for field-programmable software.

Field-programmable gate arrays (FPGAs) were invented in 1984, and are the most advanced kind of programmable logic available today. These high-capacity devices may implement extremely complex logic, such as microprocessors or digital signal processors. Today, they are a great aid in the development and rapid deployment of digital electronic devices. FPGAs are often used for prototyping hardware designs and hardware acceleration.

== Hobbyist opportunities ==
Many consumer electronic devices (including MP3 players, broadband routers, cell phones, and digital cameras) contain embedded systems based on general-purpose microprocessors and microcontrollers. Most of these devices contain field-programmable components which can be located and accessed by knowledgeable hardware hackers. Field-programming allows hobbyists to replace a device's firmware with new code that can modify or extend its capabilities.

Numerous online communities have sprung up around devices found to be particularly conducive to such modification. For example, the iPodLinux and OpenWrt projects have enabled users to run full-featured Linux distributions on their MP3 players and wireless routers, respectively.

While hobbyist field-programming is theoretically possible in practically any embedded system today, in practice efforts to modify consumer devices are often hampered by lack of documentation for the hardware.

== See also ==
- Firmware
- JTAG
- Field-programmable gate array (FPGA)
- Field-programmable analog array (FPAA) - like FPGA but with analog signals
  - Field-programmable radio frequency devices
