= Microserver =

Server based on a system on a chip

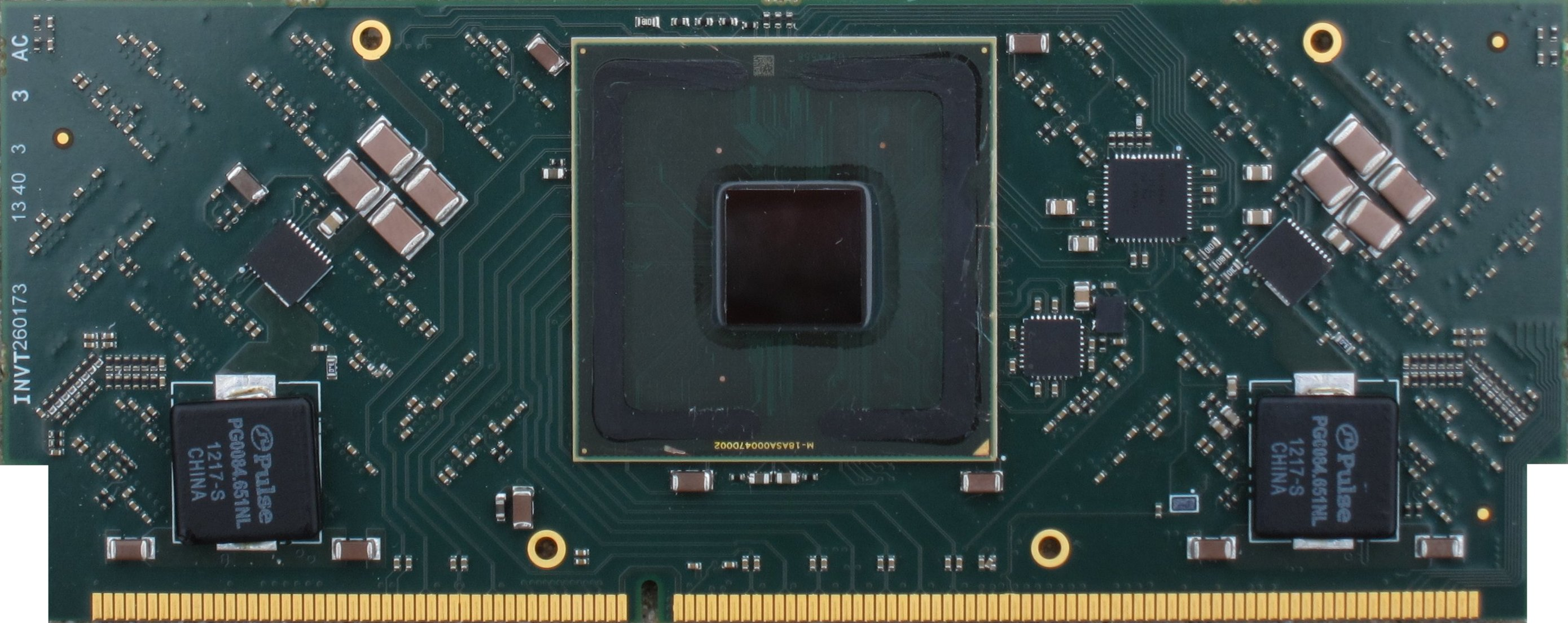
DOME P5020, 139 mm × 55 mm microserver

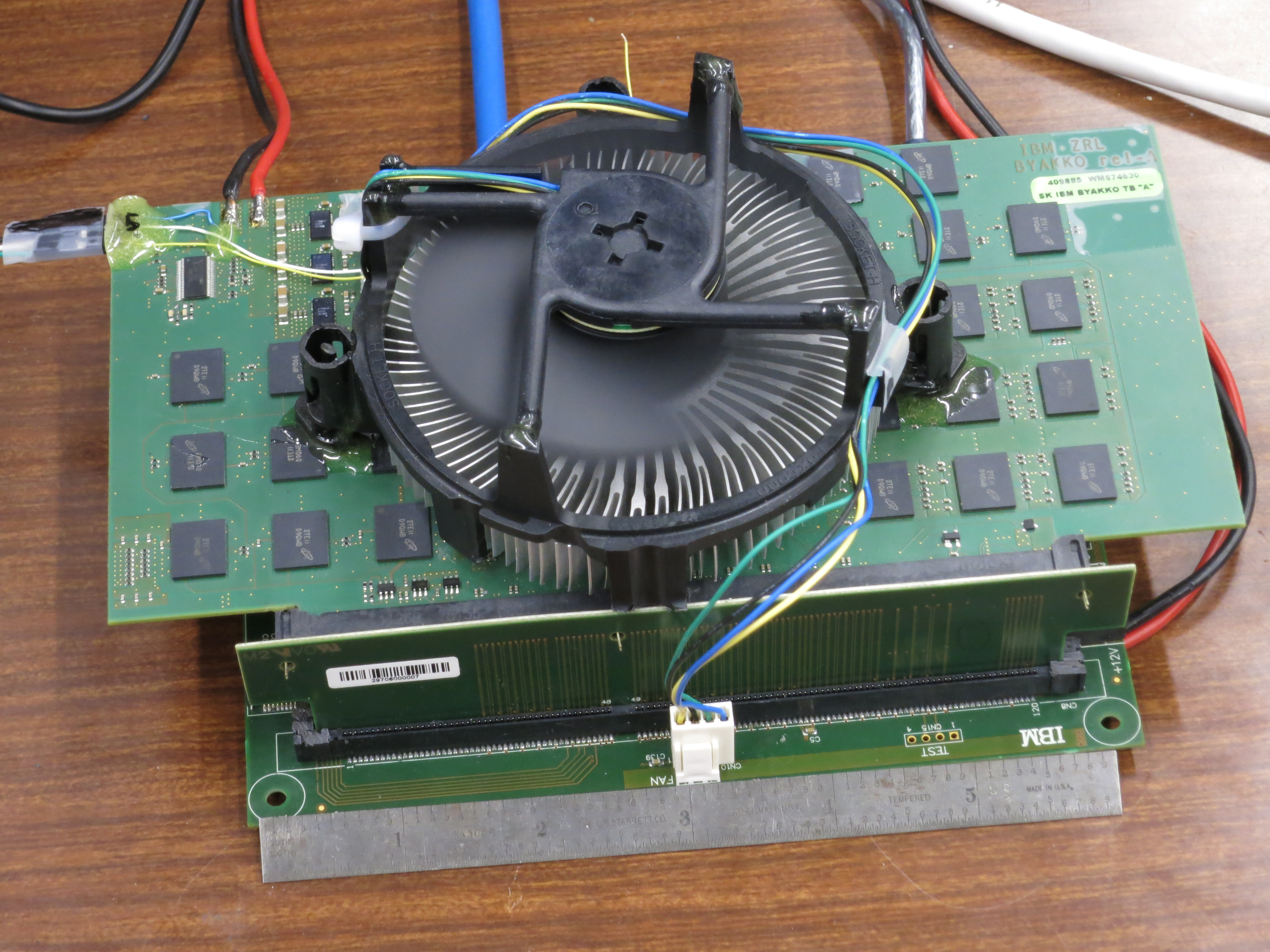
DOME T4240 revision 1, prototype microserver

DOME T4240ZMS, production microserver

A microserver or a miniserver is a server-class computer which is based on a system on a chip (SoC). The goal is to integrate all of the server motherboard functions onto a single microchip, except DRAM, boot flash, hard disk drive, solid-state drive and power circuits. Thus, the main chip contains more than only compute cores, caches, memory interfaces and PCIe controllers. It typically also contains SATA, M.2, U.2, networking, serial port and boot FLASH interfaces on the same chip. This eliminates support chips (and therefore area, power and cost) at the board level. Multiple microservers can be put together in a small package to construct dense data center (example: DOME MicroDataCenter).

== History ==
The term "microserver" first appeared in the late 1990s and was popularized by a Palo Alto incubator; PicoStar when incubating Cobalt Microservers. Microserver again appeared around 2010 and is commonly misunderstood to imply low performance. Microservers first appeared in the embedded market, where due to cost and space these types of SoCs appeared before they did in general purpose computing. Indeed, recent research indicates that emerging scale-out services and popular datacenter workloads (e.g., as in CloudSuite) require a certain degree of single-thread performance (with out-of-order execution cores) which may be lower than those in conventional desktop processors but much higher than those in the embedded systems.

A modern microserver typically offers medium-high performance at high packaging densities, allowing very small compute node form factors. This can result in high energy efficiency (operations per Watt), typically better than that of highest single-thread performance processors.

One of the early microservers is the 32-bit SheevaPlug. There are plenty of consumer grade 32-bit microservers available, for instance the Banana Pi as seen on Comparison of single-board computers. Early 2015, even a 64-bit consumer grade microserver is announced. Mid 2017 consumer-grade 64-bit microservers started appear, for example the Raspberry Pi3. Data center–grade microservers need to be 64-bit and run server class operating systems such as RHEL or SUSE.

== Commercialization ==
- Dell was among the first to build a commercially available microserver. In May 2009 Dell launched the Fortuna platform based on the VIA Nano processor. The system was designed for a specific European customer.
- SeaMicro followed shortly after Dell with one of the first generally available microservers. SeaMicro launched the SM10000 in June 2010. The SM1000 was based on the Intel Atom processor. SeaMicro followed the SM1000 with the SM1000-64 using a 64 bit Atom processor, and then switched to Intel's Sandy Bridge processor for the SM1000-XE in 2011. They were acquired by AMD in 2012.
- Calxeda, now out of business, was one of the first companies to start building ARM based microservers, using 32-bit ARM cores. They went out of business before they could make the transition to 64-bit.
- Hewlett-Packard Enterprise has the commercial Moonshot product line and the ProLiant MicroServer product line with 64-bit capability.
- in 2016, the startup Kaleao introduced the KMAX product line based on ARM

In 2015 microservers, sometimes also (confusingly) called 'scale-out servers' or even 'scale-in servers' are getting plenty of attention in the press.

== See also ==
- Server appliance
- DOME MicroDataCenter
- Asperitas Microdatacenter
- Mini PC
