= IBM 4758 =

Secure cryptoprocessor

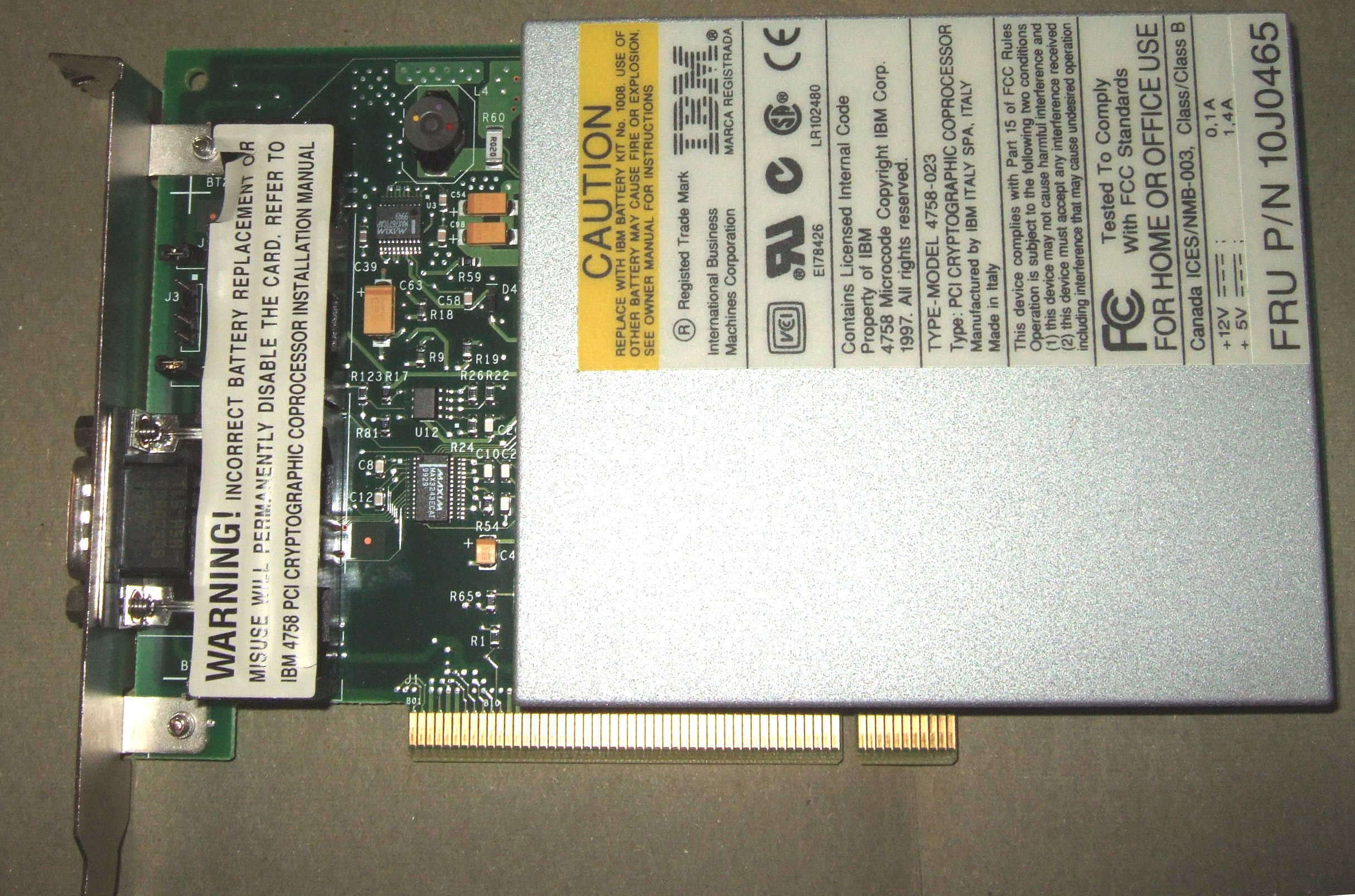
IBM 4758

The IBM 4758 PCI Cryptographic Coprocessor is a secure cryptoprocessor implemented on a high-security, tamper resistant, programmable PCI expansion card. Specialized cryptographic electronics, microprocessor, memory, and random number generator housed within a tamper-responding environment provide a highly secure subsystem in which data processing and cryptography can be performed.

IBM supplies two cryptographic-system implementations, and toolkits for custom application development:

- The PKCS#11, version 2.01 implementation creates a high-security solution for application programs developed for this industry-standard API.
- The IBM Common Cryptographic Architecture implementation provides many functions of special interest in the finance industry and a base on which custom processing and cryptographic functions can be added.

As of June 2005, the 4758 was discontinued and was replaced by an improved, faster model called the IBM 4764.
