= Field-programmable RF =

Radio frequency transceiver microchip

The field-programmable RF (FPRF) is a class of radio frequency transceiver microchip that mimics the concept of an FPGA (field programmable gate array) in the radio frequency domain to deliver a multi-standard, multi frequency device.

The earliest use of the term comes from Wireless Design Mag and it has subsequently been used by a wide range of electronics trade magazines to describe the emerging class of multi frequency and multi standard flexible RF chips.

== History ==
The term was coined by the US trade title Wireless Design Mag to describe an emerging class of highly flexible transceivers. It has since been used by a range of English-language electronics and telecoms trade journals across the globe, including EE Times Asia, Electronics Weekly (UK), Digitimes (Taiwan), EE Times (US), and Light Reading (UK / US)

The device enabled telecommunications equipment manufacturers to cope with the lack of universal communication standards and frequencies. Existing limitations meant very few countries' telecommunications regulators adopted the same standard or bandwidth, this either required multi-band (such as tri-band phones) equipment that could be used in many countries or reduced the scales of economy that manufacturers could benefit from. The multi-standard, multi-frequency traits of the FPRF enabled a single design to be configured using software.

Devices with this new functionality were first demonstrated in late 2007 and early 2008. One of the first such devices was Lime Microsystems microTCA Broadband transceiver, demonstrated at Mobile World Congress in February 2008. This had a frequency range of 350MHz to 4GHz and was suited to WiMax. FPRF designs have subsequently emerged from a range of companies and, to date, the most flexible FPRF currently on the market delivers 300 MHz to 3.8 GHz and allows operation on a range of standards, including FDD-LTE, TDD-LTE, W-CDMA, CDMA-2000 and HSDPA+ and WiMAX.

== Adoption ==
=== Communications equipment ===
Field Programmable RF technology has been adopted by a number of companies for a diverse range of projects. These include:

- Cambridge Consultants – disaster zone / emergency services communications
- Ubee Airwalk – software upgradable enterprise femtocells
- Fairwaves – open source base station
- Agilent – wireless test demonstrator
- Nuand – open source software defined radio platform

=== Open source ===
A number of open-source platforms have been developed using FPRF chips. Three significant open-source hardware project launches using FPRF technology took place in 2013.

Fairwaves launched what it describes as the "first industrial-grade open-source base station" on Hardware Freedom Day, April 2013.

This was preceded by the Myriad RF project, which was launched in beta mode in March 2013 as a "non-profit initiative... [aiming] to give both hobbyists and experienced design engineers a range of low-cost RF boards and free design files available for general use."

A third open-source FPRF project has been announced on the social funding platform Kickstarter. Nuand announced it was looking for $100,000 funding for its BladeRF platform on January 19, 2013, and raised nearly double ($191,422) its target in the 30-day fundraising cycle.

== Citations ==
In 2011 a board using FPRF technology to deliver MIMO (multi-in, multi-out) technology was cited in the European Union / Seventh Framework Programme's radio optimization roadmap, Acropolis. The project seeks to establish the key technologies for future software defined and cognitive radio systems.

== See also ==
- Field-programmable analog arrays (FPAA), of which field-programmable RF devices are a subclass
- Field-programmable gate array (FPGA) for the concept applied to digital signals
- Field-programmability
- Analog signal
- Radio frequency
