= Behavior selection algorithm =

Algorithm that selects actions for intelligent agents

In artificial intelligence (AI), a behavior selection algorithm, or action selection algorithm, is an algorithm that selects appropriate behaviors or actions for one or more intelligent agents. In video game AI, it selects behaviors or actions for one or more non-player characters (NPCs). Common behavior selection algorithms include:

- Finite-state machines (FSMs)
  - Hierarchical finite-state machines (HSMs)
- Decision trees
- Behavior trees
- Hierarchical task networks (HTNs)
- Hierarchical control systems (HCSs)
- Utility systems
- Dialogue tree or conversation tree — for selecting what to say

== Related concepts ==
In application programming, run-time selection of the behavior of a specific method is referred to as the strategy design pattern.

== See also ==
- AI alignment
- Artificial intelligence detection software
- Cognitive model — all cognitive models exhibit behavior in terms of making decisions (taking action), making errors, and with various reaction times.
- Behavioral modeling, in systems theory
- Behavioral modeling in hydrology
- Behavioral modeling in computer-aided design
- Behavioral modeling language
- Case-based reasoning, solving new problems based on solutions of past problems
- Model-based reasoning
- Synthetic intelligence
- Weak AI
