= Generative Design in Minecraft =

Programming contest

- Status: Active
- Genre: Generative designs; Minecraft
- Inaugurated: May 31, 2018; 8 years ago
- Most recent: June 15, 2023; 3 years ago
- Attendance: ▲21 (2021)
- Website: gendesignmc.engineering.nyu.edu

GDMC (short for Generative Design in Minecraft) is a programming competition to create procedurally generated settlements in Minecraft. The competition is organized by academics from New York University, the University of Hertfordshire and the Queen Mary University of London.

The competition tasks participants with creating an AI (short for Artificial Intelligence) that will create functional and visually attractive structures that believably fit into the world of Minecraft. The purpose of the competition is to advance the field of procedurally generated areas in games and train newcomers to this category of coding. The competitors' AI algorithm will have to see a landscape of a specific Minecraft world and find a way to place a structure there by placing, deleting, or moving different aspects of the landscape. The end goal is for the structure to fit into the landscape while preserving the general layout and without making the structure nonsensical.

The participants of the competition are judged by the following criteria: adaptability, functionality, narrative, and aesthetics. In more specific terms: do the structures generated reflect the environment and do they adapt well to the terrain, are the structures good for gameplay in terms of survival mode and scaled to be properly utilized, does the structure have intention behind it and does it display its narrative history, and is the structure consistent in its looks. These criteria allow for participants to foster their creativity within this competition. As well as this, it furthers their understanding of procedurally generated terrain utilizing AI algorithms.

== Organisers ==
- Michael Cerny Green (New York University)
- Christoph Salge (University of Hertfordshire)
- Rodrigo Canaan (New York University)
- Christian Guckelsberger (Queen Mary University of London)
- Julian Togelius (New York University)
