= EGanges =

eGanges (electronic Glossed adversarial nested graphical expert system) is an expert system shell, mainly for the domains of law, quality control management, and education. It represents and processes systems of mixed hypothetical and categorical syllogisms, no matter how large and complex. The hypothetical premises or rule systems are represented in River graphics that are tributary structures like Ishikawa diagrams that may be nested to any depth required by the expertise.

Instructions on the user’s categorical premises are received as input when answers are given to questions in the communication system of the interface. Each antecedent and consequent in the rule system is represented as a node in the River graphic, and each node has a question with three alternative answers: positive, negative and uncertain. As answers are selected by the user, their node labels appear as feedback in the appropriate adversarial case window and the Current result is available in the Current result window if the Current result button is pressed.

The answers are alternate three values and there is a fourth value, unanswered, allowed in the combinatoric deductive processing, where the user does not select an answer. Thus the process simulates the application of a four value logic. Its heuristics incorporate expert priorities in conjunctions and disjunctions, in determining pro tem and Final consequents throughout a consultation.

Each node may also be glossed in different ways. A spectrum gloss is available to represent inductive instances that fall into the three categories of positive, negative and uncertain, as data to assist the selection of answers. Abductive glosses may take free form as text providing justification or reasons for a rule or part thereof. There may also be gloss links to other programs or websites that provide further understanding of the rule system and what input should be given by the user.

Dr Pamela N. Gray designed eGanges in 2002 as part of her doctoral work. Subsequently, the design was programmed by her son, Xenogene Gray, who is a computational physicist. The software was first presented at the JURIX Conference at Utrecht University in 2003. A small eGanges applet in the field of finance law can be trialled at the following website:
