= Georgios N. Yannakakis =

Director & professor

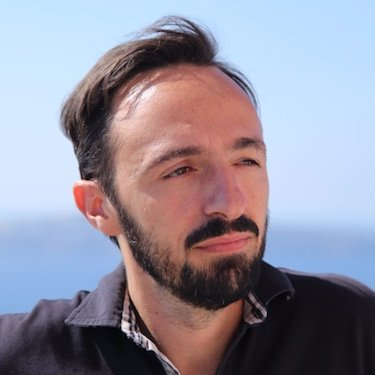
- Georgios N. Yannakakis
- Occupations: Director and Professor

Georgios N. Yannakakis is Director and Professor at the Institute of Digital Games, University of Malta and Editor-in-Chief of IEEE Transactions on Games. He is one of the leading researchers within player affective modelling and adaptive content generation for games. He is considered one of the most accomplished experts at the intersection of games and AI.

== Career ==
Yannakakis received his Diploma in Production Engineering from the Technical University of Crete, Greece, and in 2006 his PhD from the Department of Informatics, University of Edinburgh, UK. He was an Assistant and then Associate Professor at the IT University of Copenhagen from 2007 to 2012, and from 2012 he has been an Associate Professor and then a Full Professor at the University of Malta.

== Research ==
Yannakakis has pioneered the use of preference learning algorithms in combination with player questionnaires to create statistical models of player's experiences when playing computer games.

Additionally, Yannakakis has made significant contributions to procedural content generation in games, in particular the Search-based Procedural Content Generation and Experience-driven Procedural Content Generation frameworks. In Search-based Procedural Content Generation, evolutionary algorithms are used to create content through search in content space. In Experience-driven Procedural Content Generation, a model of player experience is used as an objective function to create game content that is adapted to the player's preference and/or behavior.

Another area which Yannakakis has contributed to is computational creativity. In particular, he has co-invented the DeLeNoX algorithm for automatic transformational creativity through combining deep learning with novelty search, and the surprise search algorithm, which is an algorithm related to novelty search but based on a model of the psychological notion of surprise. Some of his research on computational creativity has also focused on how to create content across multiple facets of games.

Yannakakis' research has attracted attention from Danish newspapers and TV. It has also attracted attention from games press such as Kotaku.

In 2018, Yannakakis (together with Julian Togelius) co-authored a textbook on artificial intelligence and games, simply called Artificial Intelligence and Games and published by Springer Nature. Together with Togelius, he also organized a summer school on the topics of the book. He has also co-edited a book on Emotion in Games.
