= Digital buffer =

Isolating electronic circuit

Representation of a digital buffer

A digital buffer (or a logic buffer) is an electronic circuit element used to copy a digital input signal and isolate it from any output load. For the typical case of using voltages as logic signals, a logic buffer's input impedance is high, so it draws little current from the input circuit, to avoid disturbing its signal.

The digital buffer is important in data transmission between connected systems. Buffers are used in registers (data storage device) and buses (data transferring device). To connect to a shared bus, a tri-state digital buffer should be used, because it has a high impedance ("inactive" or "disconnected") output state (in addition to logic low and high).

== Functionality ==
A voltage buffer amplifier transfers a voltage from a high output impedance circuit to a second circuit with low input impedance. Directly connecting a low impedance load to a power source draws current according to Ohm's law. The high current affects the source. Buffer inputs are high impedance. A buffered load effectively does not affect the source circuit. The buffer's output current is generated within the buffer. In this way, a buffer provides isolation between a power source and a low impedance. The buffer does not intentionally amplify or attenuate the input signal, and so may be called a unity gain buffer.

A digital buffer is a type of voltage buffer amplifier that is only concerned about digital logic levels, and thus may be non-linear. It may also act as a level shifter, with output voltages differing from the input voltages. One case of this is an inverting buffer which translates an active-high signal to an active-low one (or vice versa).

== Types ==
=== Single input voltage buffer ===
==== Inverting buffer ====
This buffer's output state is the opposite of the input state. If the input is high, the output is low, and vice versa. Graphically, an inverting buffer is represented by a triangle with a small circle at the output, with the circle signifying inversion. The inverter is a basic building block in digital electronics. Decoders, state machines, and other sophisticated digital devices often include inverters.

==== Non-inverting buffer ====
This kind of buffer performs no inversion or decision-making possibilities. A single input digital buffer is different from an inverter. It does not invert or alter its input signal in any way. It reads an input and outputs a value. Usually, the input side reads either HIGH or LOW input and outputs a HIGH or LOW value, correspondingly. Whether the output terminal sends off HIGH or LOW signal is determined by its input value. The output value will be high if and only if the input value is high. In other words, Q will be high if and only if A is HIGH.

=== Tri-state digital buffer ===
Unlike the single input digital buffer which has only one input, the tri-state digital buffer has two inputs: a data input and a control input. (A control input is analogous to a valve, which controls the data flow.) When the control input is active, the output value is the input value, and the buffer is not different from the single input digital buffer.

==== Active high tri-state digital buffer ====
An active-high tri-state digital buffer is a buffer that is in an active state that transmits its data input to the output only when its control input voltage is high (logic 1). But when the control input is low (logic 0), the output is high impedance (abbreviated as "Hi-Z"), as if the part had been removed from the circuit.

Non-inverting, active high
Data input	Control input	Output
0	0	Hi-Z
1	0	Hi-Z
0	1	0
1	1	1

==== Active low tri-state digital buffer ====
It is basically the same as active high digital buffer except the fact that the buffer is active when the control input is at a low state.

Non-inverting, active low
Data input	Control input	Output
0	0	0
1	0	1
0	1	Hi-Z
1	1	Hi-Z

==== Inverting tri-state digital buffer ====
Tri-state digital buffers also have inverting varieties in which the output is the inverse of the input.

Inverting, active high
Data Input	Control Input	Output
0	0	Hi-Z
1	0	Hi-Z
0	1	1
1	1	0

Inverting, active low
Data input	Control input	Output
0	0	1
1	0	0
0	1	Hi-Z
1	1	Hi-Z

== Application ==
Single input voltage buffers are used in many places for measurements including:

- In strain gauge circuitry to measure deformations in structures like bridges, airplane wings and I-beams in buildings.
- In temperature measurement circuitry for boilers and in high altitude aircraft in a cold environment.
- In control circuits for aircraft, people movers in airports, subways and in many different production operations.

Tri-state voltage buffers are used widely to transmit onto shared buses, since a bus can only transmit one input device's data at a time. The high-impedance output state effectively temporarily disconnects that input device from the bus, since at most only one device should actively drive the bus's shared wires.
