= Behavioral modeling in computer-aided design =

High-level circuit modeling technique where behavior of logic is modeled

In computer-aided design, behavioral modeling is a high-level circuit modeling technique where behavior of logic is modeled.

The Verilog-AMS and VHDL-AMS languages are widely used to model logic behavior.

== Other modeling approaches ==
- Register transfer level modeling: logic is modeled at register level
- Structural modeling: logic is modeled at both register level and gate level
