= VHDL-AMS =

Hardware description language

VHDL-AMS is a derivative of the hardware description language VHDL (IEEE 1076-2002). It includes analog and mixed-signal extensions (AMS) in order to define the behavior of analog and mixed-signal systems (IEEE 1076.1-2017).

The VHDL-AMS standard was created with the intent of enabling designers of analog and mixed signal systems and integrated circuits to create and use modules that encapsulate high-level behavioral descriptions as well as structural descriptions of systems and components.

VHDL-AMS is an industry standard modeling language for mixed signal circuits. It provides both continuous-time and event-driven modeling semantics, and so is suitable for analog, digital, and mixed analog/digital circuits. It is particularly well suited for verification of very complex analog, mixed-signal and radio frequency integrated circuits.

== Code example ==
In VHDL-AMS, a design consists at a minimum of an entity which describes the interface and an architecture which contains the actual implementation. In addition, most designs import library modules. Some designs also contain multiple architectures and configurations.

A simple ideal diode in VHDL-AMS would look something like this:

library IEEE;
use IEEE.math_real.all;
use IEEE.electrical_systems.all;

-- this is the entity
entity DIODE is
   generic (iss : current := 1.0e-14);   
   port (terminal anode, cathode : electrical);      
end entity DIODE;

architecture IDEAL of DIODE is
  quantity v across i through anode to cathode;
  constant vt : voltage := 0.0258;     
begin

  i == iss * (exp(v/vt) - 1.0);

end architecture IDEAL;

== VHDL-AMS Simulators ==
- ANSYS Simplorer
- Cadence Virtuoso AMS Designer
- Dolphin Integration SMASH
- Mentor Graphics Questa ADMS
- Mentor Graphics SystemVision
- Synopsys SaberRD

== See also ==
- Verilog-AMS, the Analog and Mixed Signal derivative of the Verilog hardware description language
- VHDL
- Electronic design automation
- Very-large-scale integration
- Modelica, a language for modeling physical systems
