= Cube 3D =

Artificial intelligence model by Roblox

- Developer: Roblox Corporation
- Licence: Cube3D Research-Only Rail-MS License
- Repository: github.com/Roblox/cube; huggingface.co/Roblox/cube3d-v0.5; huggingface.co/Roblox/cube3d-v0.1

Cube 3D is an artificial intelligence model that is developed by Roblox Corporation. It is open source and available on GitHub and Hugging Face.

In March 2026, Roblox announced Cube 3D as a mesh generation model that takes text input. In February 2026, Roblox released 4D creation in a public beta, allowing embedding Cube 3D into Roblox games.

Cube 3D is integrated into Roblox Studio and its API, and supports two modes of 4D creation.

== History ==
In March 2025, Roblox announced Cube 3D as a mesh generation model that takes text input. Its first feature was an API that allows mesh generation. That month, it was made open source. Over 1.8 million assets have been generated by Cube 3D since March 2025.

In March 2025, 4D creation was announced. That November, 4D creation was released in early access. In February 2026, Roblox released 4D creation in a public beta, allowing embedding Cube 3D into Roblox games.

== Technology ==
Cube 3D is trained on Roblox meshes. To generate meshes, it tokenises meshes and shapes and predicts the next token.

Cube 3D is integrated into Roblox Studio and the Roblox Studio API. Its API allows mesh generation.

In 4D creation, two modes can be used. Car-5 supports modular objects, and Body-1 only supports single-mesh objects.
