= AI2U: With You 'Til The End =

2025 video game

- Primary logo of AI2U: With You 'Til The End.
- Developer: AlterStaff Inc.
- Publishers: AlterStaff Inc. Neverland Entertainment
- Engine: Unity Engine
- Platforms: Windows, macOS, SteamOS
- Release: 23 January 2025
- Genres: Psychological horror, Escape room

AI2U: With You 'Til The End is a 2025 psychological horror and fantasy escape room video game developed by AlterStaff Inc. and published by AlterStaff Inc. and Neverland Entertainment. The game follows the story of a player-controlled character who is trapped in various locations and must escape their yandere girlfriend in different scenarios. AI2U was initially released as a demo, before entering Steam Early Access on 23 January 2025 for Windows and macOS. The game received mixed reviews from critics, who praised the use of AI-powered dialogue and behaviour, but criticised the game's repetitiveness.

== Plot ==
AI2U takes place in various settings, such as in an apartment, at a cabin in the woods, on a derelict space station, and on an island washed ashore with girlfriends, either catgirl Eddie, witch Elysia, Estelle (an artificially intelligent hologram), and a siren (a mermaid with water-bending powers) named Eiona, who is intent on keeping the player there. The primary objective in each level is to escape from the girlfriend by talking to them using the in-game microphone or chatbox. The girlfriends behaviour and dialogue are powered by AI, allowing for more dynamic interactions. Each level has multiple endings including escaping without being killed or convincing the girlfriend to leave with them. Items can be picked up and can be used, or given to the girlfriends as gifts. There are also clues that offer different ways to facilitate in escaping. Trust can be built up with the girlfriends, either by conversing with them, engaging in their favourite hobbies or gifting them items. Trust can also be decreased by ignoring them, pushing them (even accidentally) or leaving without permission. Upon attempting to escape, they will attempt to murder the player. Players are able to interact with the girlfriends outside of levels.

== Development ==
AI2U: With You 'Til The End was originally developed as an evolved version of the Yandere AI Girlfriend Simulator, released on the website Itch.io. The game then entered open beta after receiving strong player support. Despite requiring players to use their own OpenAI keys at first, AlterStaff later offered single purchase access, meaning individual keys were no longer a requirement to play the game. The demo version of the game received positive feedback, with Giovanni De Ita of NerdStash praising the conversational abilities of the girlfriends, though was critical of the basic text to speech voice.

== Reception ==
Reception

Aggregate score
Aggregator	Score
TapTap	8.6/10

Review scores
Publication	Score
Anime News Network	D
SunsetNerdVerse	8/10
Twisted Voxel	6/10

The game scored 8.6/10 from a total of 152 ratings on the mobile game-sharing community website TapTap.

AI2U: With You 'Til The End received mixed reviews from critics. Jean-Karlo Lemus writing for Anime News Network, whilst praising the choice of using ChatGPT to act as the intelligence behind the girlfriends, he criticised the game for being simplistic in its design, too "vague" with its dialogue and not executing the premise as effectively as previous types of similar video game, ultimately grading AI2U a D. Alt Haider of Twisted Voxel also noted the repetitiveness of the game, noticing that despite the dialogue being driven by AI, "it has its limitations". Haider expressed interest in future improvements from the developer AlterStaff Inc., scoring AI2U 6 out of 10. Reviewing the demo, Indie Game World writer Samantha Cubbison described wanting more contextual awareness from the AI girlfriends to prevent repetitive dialogue. Maksim Ivanov of IXBT compared the game to MiSide, comparing the observation element of gameplay. Ivanov praised the use of AI and said that better "eloquence" in real life catered to an improved playing experience.
