= Julian Togelius =

Video game researcher

- Occupations: Game researcher and professor

Julian Togelius is a computer scientist and a professor at the Department of Computer Science and Engineering at the New York University Tandon School of Engineering where he directs the game innovation labs. His research concerns artificial intelligence and games, including procedural content generation, player modelling, and game playing.

== Career ==
Togelius earned a BA in theoretical philosophy from Lund University in 2001, an MSc from the University of Sussex in 2003, and a PhD from the University of Essex in 2007.He was an associate professor at the Center for Computer Games Research, IT University of Copenhagen, before joining NYU.

Togelius was the editor-in-chief of the journal IEEE Transactions on Games from 2018 to 2021.With Georgios N. Yannakakis he co-authored the textbook Artificial Intelligence and Games, published by Springer in 2018, with a second edition in 2025, and he co-organises the International Summer School on AI and Games, held annually since 2018. He also co-edited Procedural Content Generation in Games.

In 2019, Togelius published Playing Smart: On Games, Intelligence, and Artificial Intelligence with MIT Press, which was reviewed in Engineering & Technology, and in 2024 Artificial General Intelligence in the MIT Press Essential Knowledge series.

== Awards and honors ==
In December 2024, Togelius was named a Fellow of the Institute of Electrical and Electronics Engineers (IEEE) for contributions to procedural content generation and artificial intelligence in video games. In 2025, he was appointed an honorary doctor at the Faculty of Technology and Society of Malmö University.

== Industry and other activities ==
Togelius co-founded modl.ai, a company that develops artificial intelligence tools for game playing and testing. He has also served as a principal at OriGenAI, an artificial intelligence company focused on the energy industry, and as Head of AI at Nof1, a company developing artificial intelligence applications for financial markets. In September 2025, he was named one of the first two members of the AI Council established by Unity.

== Research ==
Togelius was described by Kenneth O. Stanley as one of "the world's most accomplished experts at the intersection of games and AI". His research has appeared in media such as New Scientist, and Le Monde, The Verge, The Economist, and the MIT Technology Review.
