= Stephen Trimberger =

American computer scientist

- Born: 1955 (age 70–71)
- Education: California Institute of Technology (Ph.D.)
- Known for: Field-Programmable Gate Array (FPGA) technology
- Awards: NAE Member (2016); IEEE Fellow; ACM Fellow
- Scientific career
- Fields: Computer science

Stephen "Steve" Trimberger (born 1955) is an American computer scientist, electrical engineer, philanthropist, and prolific inventor with 250 US utility patents as of August 26, 2021. He is a DARPA program manager of the microsystems technology office.

== Education ==
Trimberger grew up in Sacramento, California, and earned his B.S. in Engineering and Applied Science from the California Institute of Technology (Caltech) and M.S. in Information and Computer Science from the University of California, Irvine. He later got his Ph.D. from the California Institute of Technology in 1983, after defending his thesis on the Automated Performance Optimization of Custom Integrated Circuits.

While attending Caltech, Trimberger joined the Planet-Crossing Asteroid Survey (PCAS) project with principal investigator Gene Shoemaker, operated by Eleanor "Glo" Helin. PCAS searched for asteroids that could potentially impact planets, including Earth. In recognition of his contributions to this project, minor planet 2990 was named "Trimberger."

== Career ==
Trimberger joined VLSI Technology in 1982, where, as a member of the original Design Technology group, he developed various computer-aided design software, including interactive tools, simulation, physical design automation, and logical design automation. During this time, he wrote An Introduction to CAD for VLSI, collecting and explaining the fundamental algorithms and techniques used in the early days of the CAE industry.

Since 1988, he has been employed at Xilinx, a fabless semiconductor company in San Jose, California. He was a member of the architecture definition group for the Xilinx XC4000 field-programmable gate array (FPGA), the first FPGA with dedicated arithmetic and memory. At the same time, he was the technical leader for the XC4000 design automation software. He led the architecture definition group for the Xilinx XC4000X device families. He developed a time-multiplexed FPGA and software to map to it in the 1990s, long before Tabula commercialized the time-folded FPGA. He is an inventor with approximately thirty patents in this area. In the early 1990s, he edited and co-wrote Field-Programmable Gate Array Technology, introducing the first generation of academic researchers to the industrial side of programmable-logic architecture, tools and design.

He designed the bitstream security system for the Xilinx Virtex-II [US Patent #7,058,177], the first bitstream encryption deployed in FPGAs. His inventions on that security system are the basis of security in all commercial FPGAs from Xilinx and others. He was also instrumental in bringing 3D packaging from a lab curiosity to a product in the mid-2000s [US Patent 7,605,458]. This was deployed by Xilinx as Stacked Silicon Interconnect Technology (SSIT). Trimberger led the Xilinx Advanced Development group for many years and is currently Xilinx Fellow in Xilinx Research Labs in San Jose.

Trimberger has written three books on computer-aided design for integrated circuits and FPGAs. He has written dozens of papers on design automation and FPGA architectures. He is a four-time winner of the Ross Freeman Award, Xilinx’s annual award for technical innovation.

He was named a Fellow of the Institute of Electrical and Electronics Engineers (IEEE) in 2012 for his contributions to circuits, architectures and software technology for field-programmable gate arrays. He was elected to the National Academy of Engineering in 2016 for his contributions to solid-state electronics.

== Awards ==
- 2018 IEEE Donald O. Pederson Award in Solid-State Circuits
