= IEEE Donald O. Pederson Award in Solid-State Circuits =

- Awarded for: Outstanding contributions to solid-state circuits, as exemplified by benefit to society, enhancement to technology, and professional leadership
- Presented by: Institute of Electrical and Electronics Engineers
- First award: 1989
- Website: IEEE Donald O. Pederson Award in Solid-State Circuits

The IEEE Donald O. Pederson Award in Solid-State Circuits is a Technical Field Award of the Institute of Electrical and Electronics Engineers (IEEE). It was previously called the IEEE Solid-State Circuits Award. In November 2005 the award was renamed to honor Donald O. Pederson. He was one of the co-founders of the IEEE Solid-State Circuits Council, and was a driving force behind the initiation of the IEEE Journal of Solid-State Circuits.

Recipients of this award receive a bronze medal, a certificate and an honorarium.

This award is given for "outstanding contributions to solid-state circuits, as exemplified by benefit to society, enhancement to technology, and professional leadership". The award may be presented to an individual, or a team of up to three people.

== Recipients ==
The following people received this award as the IEEE Donald O. Pederson Award in Solid-State Circuits:

- 2027: Wanda Kay Gass
- 2026: Jan M. Rabaey
- 2025: Michiel S. J. Steyaert
- 2024: Deong-Kyoon Jeong
- 2023: Ingrid Verbauwhede
- 2022: Akira Matsuzawa
- 2021: A. Paul Brokaw
- 2020: Klaas Bult
- 2019: Laurence W. Nagel
- 2018: William S. Carter
- 2018: Stephen M. Trimberger
- 2017: Takao Nishitani
- 2017: John S. Thompson
- 2016: Miles A. Copeland
- 2015: Robert Whitlock Adams
- 2014: Robert G. Meyer
- 2013: Anantha P. Chandrakasan
- 2012: Behzad Razavi
- 2011: Willy Sansen
- 2010: Takayasu Sakurai
- 2009: Teresa H. Meng
- 2008: Asad A. Abidi
- 2007: Hugo De Man
- 2006: Mark A. Horowitz

The following people received this award as the IEEE Solid-State Circuits Award:

- 2005: Bruce A. Wooley
- 2004: Eric A. Vittoz
- 2003: Daniel W. Dobberpuhl
- 2002: Ping-Keung Ko
- 2002: Chenming Calvin Hu
- 2001: No Award
- 2000: Hung-Fai (Stephen) Law
- 2000: Robert H. Krambeck
- 1999: Kensall D. Wise
- 1998: Nicky C. Lu
- 1997: Robert W. Brodersen
- 1996: Rudy J. van de Plassche
- 1995: Lewis M. Terman
- 1994: Paul R. Gray
- 1993: Kiyoo Itoh
- 1992: Barrie Gilbert
- 1991: Frank Wanlass
- 1990: Toshiaki Masuhara
- 1989: James D. Meindl
