= Asad Abidi =

Pakistani-American electrical engineer

Asad Ali Abidi
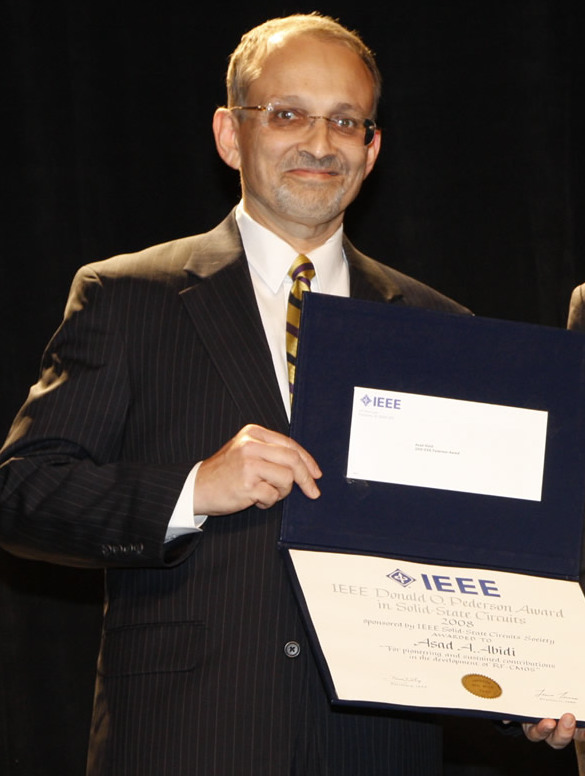
- Born: July 12, 1956 (age 70); Rawalpindi, Pakistan
- Education: Imperial College, London; University of California, Berkeley
- Known for: RF CMOS; RF circuit modeling
- Awards: IEEE Donald O. Pederson Award in Solid-State Circuits (2008); IEEE Third Millennium Medal; IEEE Donald G. Fink Prize Paper Award; Member of the National Academy of Engineering
- Scientific career
- Fields: Electrical Engineering; Electronics engineering
- Workplaces: Bell Laboratories; University of California, Los Angeles; Lahore University of Management Sciences
- Doctoral advisor: Robert G. Meyer

Asad Ali Abidi (born 1956) is a Pakistani-American electrical engineer. He serves as a Distinguished professor of Electrical and Computer Engineering at University of California, Los Angeles. He was the inaugural holder of the Abdus Salam Chair at the Lahore University of Management Sciences (LUMS). He is best known for pioneering RF CMOS technology during the late 1980s to early 1990s. As of 2008, the radio transceivers in all wireless networking devices and modern mobile phones are mass-produced as RF CMOS devices.

Abidi received his B.S. from the Imperial College London followed by a M.S. and PhD from the University of California, Berkeley in 1981. He was a Member of Technical Staff at the Advanced LSI Development Laboratory at Bell Labs in Murray Hill, NJ from 1982 to 1985, where he developed the very first integrated receivers for gigabit optical fiber communication in an experimental 1-μm NMOS technology.

In January 1985 joined UCLA as a tenured academic. In 2007, he left for a three-year sabbatical to work as a founding dean of the engineering school at Lahore University of Management Sciences (LUMS) and returned to Los Angeles in 2009. In 2017, he was named as the inaugural holder of the Abdus Salam Chair at LUMS.

Abidi is a prominent academic and is a member of the National Academy of Engineering and The World Academy of Sciences. He received the IEEE Donald O. Pederson Award in Solid-State Circuits in 2008. In 2015, UC, Berkeley recognised him as a distinguished alumnus for his contributions to the theory and practice of analog and RF circuits.

== Life and education ==
Born and raised in Pakistan, Abidi was educated at Cadet College Hasan Abdal until the first year of intermediate studies (Grade 11), Pakistan. In 1973, he completed A-levels from Dudley College of Technology, UK, and gained a B.Sc. degree (with first-class honours) in electrical engineering at Imperial College, London, in 1976. Later he attended University of California, Berkeley; he gained an M.Sc. degrees in electrical engineering in 1978 and a Ph.D. in 1981 under the supervision of Robert Meyer. Abidi is an IEEE Fellow and a member of the United States National Academy of Engineering (NAE). He joined LUMS (Lahore University of Management Sciences) School of Science and Engineering as its first dean.

== Academic career ==
Since 1985, Abidi has worked at UCLA, where he is currently a Distinguished Professor. From 1981 to 1984, he worked for Bell Laboratories as a Member of Technical Staff at the Advanced LSI Development Laboratory. He was a Visiting Faculty Researcher at Hewlett Packard Laboratories in 1989. He is one of only a few Pakistani-origin members of the NAE. and was recognized as an ISSCC top-ten author.

While working at Bell and then UCLA, he pioneered radio research in metal–oxide–semiconductor (MOS) technology and made seminal contributions to radio architecture based on complementary MOS (CMOS) switched-capacitor (SC) technology. While working at Bell in the early 1980s, he worked on the development of sub-micron MOSFET (metal–oxide–semiconductor field-effect transistor) VLSI (very large-scale integration) technology at the Advanced LSI Development Lab, along with Marty Lepselter, George E. Smith and Harry Boll. As one of the few circuit designers at the lab, Abidi demonstrated the potential of sub-micron NMOS integrated circuit technology in high-speed communication circuits, and developed the first MOS amplifiers for Gb/s data rates in optical fiber receivers. Abidi's work was initially met with skepticism from proponents of GaAs and bipolar junction transistors, the dominant technologies for high-speed circuits at the time. In 1985, he joined UCLA, where he pioneered RF CMOS technology during the late 1980s to early 1990s. His work changed the way in which RF circuits would be designed, away from discrete bipolar transistors and towards CMOS integrated circuits.

He was a visiting researcher at HP Labs for a year in 1989, during which time he investigated A/D conversion at ultra-high speeds, before returning to UCLA and researching analog signal chains for disk drive read channels, high-speed A/D conversion, and analog CMOS circuits for signal processing and communications. Abidi, along with UCLA colleagues J. Chang and Michael Gaitan, demonstrated the first RF CMOS amplifier in 1993. In 1995, Abidi used CMOS switched-capacitor technology to demonstrate the first direct-conversion transceivers for digital communications.

In the late 1990s, the RF CMOS technology he pioneered was widely adopted in wireless networking as mobile phones entered widespread use. As of 2008, the radio transceivers in all wireless networking devices and modern mobile phones are mass-produced as RF CMOS devices.

Abidi served as Program Secretary for the IEEE International Solid-State Circuits Conference (ISSCC) from 1984 to 1990 and as General Chairman of the Symposium on VLSI Circuits in 1992. He was the Secretary of the IEEE Solid-State Circuits Council from 1990 to 1991. From 1992 to 1995, he was the editor-in-chief of the IEEE Journal of Solid-State Circuits.

== Awards and recognitions ==
- 2022 Best Paper Award, IEEE Journal of Solid-State Circuits (co-winner)
- 2013 Armstrong Memorial Lecturer, Columbia University
- 2013 ISSCC Outstanding Contributor over its 60 years
- 2012 Best Paper Award, IEEE Journal of Solid-State Circuits (co-winner)
- 2012 ISSCC Distinguished Technical Paper Award
- 2009 The World Academy of Sciences-TWAS
- 2008 UCLA HSSEAS Lockheed Martin Award for Excellence in Teaching
- 2008 IEEE Donald O. Pederson Award in Solid-State Circuits
  "For pioneering and sustained contributions in the development of RF-CMOS"
- 2007 National Academy of Engineering
  "For contributions to the development of integrated circuits for MOS RF communications"
- Top 10 contributors to the ISSCC in its 50-year history
- 2000 IEEE Third Millennium Medal
- 1998 Design Contest Award at the Design Automation Conference
- 1997 ISSCC Jack Raper Outstanding Technology Directions Paper Award
- 1997 IEEE Donald G. Fink Prize Paper Award
- 1996 Best Paper Award of the 21st European Solid State Circuits Conference
- 1988 TRW Award for Innovative Teaching Postdoctoral Research Associate

== Fellowships and academy membership ==
- An IEEE Fellow (1996)
- Member, United States National Academy of Engineering (NAE) (2007)
- Fellow, The World Academy of Sciences (TWAS) (2009)

== Bibliography ==
- Ahmad Mirzaei, Asad Abidi, Analysis and Design of IF and RF Circuits for SDR Receivers: Anti-aliasing Pre-filters, Accurate and Low-noise Quadrature LO Generation and Injection-locked Dividers, VDM Verlag, 2008
- Emad Hegazi, Jacob Rael, and Asad Abidi, The Designer's Guide to High-Purity Oscillators, Springer, 2005. ISBN 1-4020-7666-5
- Asad A. Abidi, P. R. Gray, and R. G. Meyer, editors, Integrated Circuits for Wireless Communications, IEEE Press, NY, 1998
