= CICC =

CICC may refer to:

- Cebu International Convention Center, a convention center in Mandaue City, Cebu, Philippines
- China International Capital Corporation, an investment banking firm in China
- CICC-TV, a CTV television station in Yorkton, Saskatchewan, Canada
- Coalition for the International Criminal Court, civil society in 150 countries advocating for a fair, effective and independent International Criminal Court
- Cook Islands Christian Church, the largest religious denomination in the Cook Islands
- Copenhagen International Choreography Competition, a choreography competition in Copenhagen, Denmark
- Custom Integrated Circuits Conference, a yearly academic conference sponsored by the IEEE
- China Intercontinental Communication Center, a Chinese state media organization
