= Teresa Meng =

American electrical engineer (born 1961)

- Born: 1961 (age 64–65)
- Education: National Taiwan University (BS); University of California, Berkeley (MS, PhD)
- Title: Founder, Atheros
- Scientific career
- Fields: Electrical engineering Computer science
- Thesis: Asynchronous design for digital signal processing architectures (1988)
- Doctoral advisor: David Messerschmitt; Robert W. Brodersen

Teresa Huai-Ying Meng (Chinese: 孟懷縈; pinyin: Mèng Huáiyíng; born 1961) is a Taiwanese electrical engineer, computer scientist, and entrepreneur who is the Reid Weaver Dennis Professor Emeritus of Electrical Engineering at Stanford University. She founded the computer networking company Atheros.

In 2007, Meng was elected as a member into the National Academy of Engineering for pioneering the development of distributed wireless network technology.

== Early life and education ==
Meng was born and raised in Taiwan. Her mother was an accountant and her father, Shih-Ko Meng, was an industrial engineer who co-founded the first semiconductor manufacturing company in Taiwan in the 1970s.

After high school, Meng graduated from National Taiwan University with a Bachelor of Science in electrical engineering in 1983. She then earned her Master of Science in electrical engineering and computer science in 1985 and her Ph.D. in electrical engineering and computer science in 1988 from the University of California, Berkeley. Her doctoral dissertation, completed under Robert W. Brodersen and David Messerschmitt, was titled, "Asynchronous design for digital signal processing architectures".

== Career ==
She joined the Stanford faculty in 1988. Her research activities in the first 10 years focused on low-power circuit and system design, video signal processing, and wireless communications. In 1998, Prof. Meng took leave from Stanford and founded Atheros Communications, Inc., which developed semiconductor system solutions for wireless network communications products.

After returning to Stanford in 2000, Meng continued her teaching and research, and turned her research interest to applying signal processing and IC design to bio-medical engineering. She collaborated with Prof. Krishna Shenoy on neural signal processing and neural prosthetic systems. She also directed a research group exploring wireless power transfer and implantable bio-medical devices.

Prof. Meng retired from Stanford in 2013. She serves on the boards of Ambarella and the Alliance Cultural Foundation International and is Advisor to Atmosic Technologies.

In 2019, Teresa H. Meng was the recipient of the IEEE Alexander Graham Bell medal. This marked the first time a female was the recipient of the award. Meng was awarded this due to her contributions and leadership in the development of wireless semiconductor technology. In 2024, Meng receives Marconi Prize.

== Atheros Communications ==
In 1998, Meng took leave from her post at Stanford University to found Atheros Communications, a company which focused on technology for wireless communications. A provider of Wi-Fi technologies and solutions, Atheros went public in 2004. In 2006, Atheros partnered with mobile CDMA leader, Qualcomm, to create integrated cellular and Wi-Fi solutions, with initial application in the smartphone. The partnership culminated in the Qualcomm acquisition of Atheros in 2011. In her role as founder of Atheros, Meng was named one of Top 10 entrepreneurs of the Year by Red Herring (2001), and received the 20/20 Vision Award, CIO Magazine (2002), and Innovator of the Year, MIT Sloan Business School (2002).

Meng has been credited by the IEEE for her CMOS-integrated radio-frequency innovations, which led to the availability of inexpensive wireless data communications that fueled the wireless revolution by enabling low-cost, high-performance LANs.

== Boards, advisory committees, professional organizations ==
- Director, Ambarella, Inc. (2018–Present)
- Director, Alliance Cultural Foundation International (2017–Present)
- Advisor, Atmosic Technologies (2016–Present)
- Academician, Academia Sinica, Taiwan (2010–Present)
- Member, National Academy of Engineering (2007–Present)
- Trustee, Computer Science Museum (2006–2008)
- Director of CS and Telecommunication Board, National Academies (2003–2009)
- Founder and Director, Atheros Communications Inc (1999–2011)
- Fellow, IEEE (1998–Present)

== Selected articles ==
Signal Processing and Wireless Communications

- Teresa H. Meng and David G. Messerschmitt, "Arbitrarily High Sampling Rate Adaptive Filters," IEEE Transactions on Signal Processing, Vol. ASSP-34, No. 4, pp. 455–470, April 1987 (best paper award).
- Teresa H. Meng, Benjamin M. Gordon, Ely K. Tsern and Andy C. Hung, "Portable Video-on-Demand in Wireless Communication," invited paper, Proceedings of IEEE, Vol. 83, No. 4, pp. 659–680, April 1995.
- Peter J. Black and Teresa H. Meng, "A 1Gb/s, 4-State, Sliding Block Viterbi Decoder," IEEE Journal of Solid-States Circuits, Vol. 32, No. 6, pp. 797–805, June 1997.
- Teresa H. Meng, "Low-Power Wireless Video Systems," invited paper, IEEE Communications Magazine, Vol. 36, No. 6, pp. 130–137, June 1998.
- Won Namgoong, Sydney Reader and Teresa H. Meng, "An All-Digital Low-Power IF GPS Synchronizer," IEEE Journal of Solid-State Circuits, Vol. 35, No. 6, pp. 856–864, June 2000.
- Jeffrey G. Andrews and Teresa H. Meng, "Performance of MC-CDMA with Successive Interference Cancellation," IEEE Transactions on Communications, Vol. 52, No. 5, pp. 811–822, May 2004.
- Alok Aggarwal and Teresa H. Meng, "Minimizing the Peak-to-Average Power Ratio of OFDM Signals Using Convex Optimization," IEEE Trans. on Signal Processing, Vol. 54, No. 8, pp. 3099–3110, August 2006.
- Volkan Rodoplu and Teresa H. Meng, "Bits-per-Joule Capacityof Energy-Limited Wireless Networks," IEEE Trans. on Wireless Communications, Vol. 6, No. 3, pp. 857–865, March 2007.

Atheros Network and SoC Designs

- Bill McFarland, Greg Chesson, Carl Temme, Teresa H. Meng, "The 5-UP Protocol for Unified, Multi-Service Wireless Networks," invited paper, IEEE Communications Magazine, pp. 84–92, November 2002.
- Teresa H. Meng, Bill McFarland, David Su, John Thomson,"Design and Implementation of an ALL-CMOS 802.11a Wireless LAN Chipset," invited paper, IEEE Communications Magazine, Vol. 41, No. 8, pp. 160–168, August 2003.
- Srenik Mehta, D. Weber, M. Terrovitis, K. Onodera, M. Mack, B. Kaczynki, H. Samavati, S. Jen, W. Si, M. Lee, K. Singh, S. Mendis, P. Husted, N. Zhang, B. McFarland, D. Su, T. Meng, and B. Wooley, "An 802.11g WLAN SoC", IEEE Journal of Solid-State Circuits, Vol. 40, No. 12, pp. 2483–2491, December 2005.

Neural Signal Processing

- Caleb Kemere, Krishna Shenoy and Teresa H. Meng, "Model-Based Neural Decoding of Reaching Movements: A Maximum Likelihood Approach," IEEE Transactions on Biomedical Engineering, Vol. 51, No. 6, pp. 925–932, June 2004.
- Gopal Santhanam, Michael D. Linderman, Vikash Gilja, Afsheen Afshar, Stephen Ryu, Teresa H. Meng, Krishna V. Shenoy, "HermesB: A Continuous Neural Recording System for Freely Behaving Primates," Transactions on Biomedical Engineering, Vol. 54, No. 11, pp. 2037–2050, November 2007.
- Michael D. Linderman. Caleb T. Kemere, Stephen O'Driscoll, Gopal Santhanam, Vikash Gilja, Byron M. Yu, Afsheen Afshar, Stephen I. Ryu, Teresa H. Meng, Krishna V. Shenoy, "Signal Processing Challenges for Neural Prostheses," IEEE Signal Processing Magazine, Vol. 25, No. 1, pp. 18–28, January 2008.
- Henrique Miranda, Vikash Gilja, Cindy Chestek, Krishna Shenoy, Teresa H. Meng, "HermesD: A High-rate Long-range Wireless Transmission System for Simultaneous Multichannel Neural Recording Applications", IEEE Transactions on Biomedical Circuits and Systems, Vol. 4, No. 3, pp. 181–191, June 2010.
- Hua Gao, Ross Walker, Teresa Meng, and Boris Murmann,"HermesE: A 96-Channel Full Data Rate Direct Neural Interface in 0.13 um CMOS", IEEE Journal of Solid-State Circuits, 2012.

Wireless Power Transfer

- Stephen O'Driscoll, Ada Poon, and Teresa H. Meng, "A mm-sized Implantable Power Receiver with Adaptive Link Compensation", Technical Digest of 2009 IEEE Inter. Solid-State Circuits Conference, February 2009.
- Stephen O'Driscoll and Teresa H. Meng, "Adaptive Signal Acquisition and Wireless Power Transfer for an Implantable Prosthesis Processor", Proc. of IEEE International Symposium on Circuits and Systems, pp. 3589–3592, Paris, France, June 2010 (Invited)

Implantable Biomedical Devices

- Daniel Pivonka, Ada Poon, and Teresa H. Meng, "Locomotive Micro-Implant with Active Electromagnetic Propulsion", IEEE Engineering in Medicine and Biology Society Conference, EMBS, Minneapolis, MN, pp. 6404–6407, September 2009.
- Daniel Pivonka, Anatoly Yakovlev, Ada Poon, and Teresa H. Meng, "A mm-sized Wirelessly Powered and Remotely Controlled Locomotive Implant," IEEE Transactions on Biomedical Circuits and Systems, 2012.
