= Behzad Razavi =

American electrical engineer

- Born: Iran
- Education: Sharif University of Technology; Stanford University
- Known for: Communication Circuitry
- Awards: Beatrice Winner Award (1994 & 2001); Lockheed Martin Excellence in Teaching Award (2006); IEEE Donald O. Pederson Award in Solid-State Circuits (2012)
- Scientific career
- Fields: Electrical Engineering
- Workplaces: Princeton University; AT&T Bell Laboratories; Stanford University; Hewlett-Packard; UCLA
- Academic advisors: Bruce Wooley

Behzad Razavi (Persian: بهزاد رضوی) is an Iranian-American professor and researcher of electrical and electronic engineering. Noted for his research in communications circuitry, Razavi is the director of the Communication Circuits Laboratory at the University of California Los Angeles. He is a Fellow and a distinguished lecturer for the Institute of Electrical and Electronics Engineers. Among his awards, Razavi is a two-time recipient of the Beatrice Winner Award for Editorial Excellence at the 1994 and 2001 International Solid-State Circuits Conferences. In 2017, he was elected as a member into the National Academy of Engineering for contributions to low-power broadband communication circuits.

== Career ==
Razavi attended the Sharif University of Technology in Tehran and received a BS degree in Electrical Engineering in 1985. After moving to the United States, he obtained his master's degree and PhD degrees from Stanford University in 1988 and 1992, respectively. Razavi initially worked as an engineer for AT&T Bell Laboratories and was an adjunct professor at Princeton University from 1992 to 1994. He returned to California in 1995 to work at Hewlett-Packard while an adjunct professor at Stanford University. In 1996 he became an Associate Professor and subsequently full Professor of electrical engineering at the University of California Los Angeles. Razavi specializes in telecommunications circuitry and his research involves work with data receivers, frequency synthesizers, and phase-locking and clock recovery for high-speed data communications.

From 1993 to 2002, Razavi served on the Technical Program Committees of the International Solid-State Circuits Conference (ISSCC), as well as for the Symposium on VLSI Circuits from 1998 to 2002. He has also worked as an editor for professional journals including the IEEE Journal of Solid-State Circuits, IEEE Transactions on Circuits and Systems I, and the International Journal of High Speed Electronics. Razavi was acknowledged with a fellowship in the Institute of Electrical and Electronics Engineers (IEEE) in 2003 "for contributions to high-speed communication circuits". He is a distinguished lecturer for the IEEE.

He is the author/editor of seven books and is recognized as one of the top 10 authors in the 50-year history of ISSCC.

== Awards ==
- 1994 Beatrice Winner Award for Editorial Excellence, (with J. Sung), A 6 GHz 60 mW BiCMOS Phase-Locked Loop with 2V Supply, International Solid-State Circuits Conference, IEEE
- 1994 Best Paper Award, European Solid-State Circuits Conference, IEEE
- 1995 Best Panel Award, International Solid-State Circuits Conference, IEEE
- 1997 Best Panel Award, International Solid-State Circuits Conference, IEEE
- 1997 Innovative Teaching Award, TRW
- 1998 Best Paper Award, Custom Integrated Circuits Conference, IEEE
- 2001 Beatrice Winner Award for Editorial Excellence, (with J. Savoj), A 10 Gb/s CMOS Clock and Data Recovery Circuit with Frequency Detection, International Solid-State Circuits Conference, IEEE
- 2001 Jack Kilby Outstanding Student Paper Award (with L. Der), A 2 GHz CMOS Image-Reject Receiver with Sign-Sign LMS Calibration., International Solid-State Circuits Conference, IEEE
- 2006 Excellence in Teaching Award, Lockheed Martin
- 2007 UCLA Faculty Senate Teaching Award
- 2012 IEEE Donald O. Pederson Award in Solid-State Circuits

== Bibliography ==
- Principles of Data Conversion System Design, IEEE Press, (1995)
- Monolithic Phase-Locked Loops and Clock Recovery Circuits, IEEE Press, (1996)
- RF Microelectronics, Prentice Hall, (1998) (translated into Chinese and Japanese)
- Design of Analog CMOS Integrated Circuits, McGraw-Hill, (2001 first edn. & 2015 second edn.) (translated to Chinese, Persian and Japanese)
- Design of Integrated Circuits for Optical Communications, McGraw-Hill, (2003)
- Phase-Locking in High-Performance Systems, IEEE Press, (2003)
- Fundamentals of Microelectronics, Wiley, (2006)
- Design of CMOS Phase-Locked Loops, Cambridge University Press, (2020)
- Analysis and Design of Data Converters, Cambridge University Press, (2025)
