= RF CMOS =

Integrated circuit technology

Die shot of a Broadcom BCM2050KMLG, an RF CMOS chip used as a WiFi 802.11g transceiver. Notice the octagon-like, spiral-like structures, which can act as inductors transformers and baluns.

Die shot of a Marvell 88W8010 WiFi 802.11g transceiver. It has both octagon-like and square-like, spiral-like structures that can also be used as inductors.

RF CMOS is a metal–oxide–semiconductor (MOS) integrated circuit (IC) technology that integrates radio-frequency (RF), analog and digital electronics on a mixed-signal CMOS (complementary MOS) RF circuit chip. It is widely used in modern Wireless telecommunications, such as cellular networks, Bluetooth, Wi-Fi, GPS receivers, broadcasting, vehicular communication systems, and the radio transceivers in all modern mobile phones and wireless networking devices. RF CMOS technology was pioneered by Pakistani engineer Asad Ali Abidi at UCLA during the late 1980s to early 1990s, and helped bring about the wireless revolution with the introduction of digital signal processing in wireless communications. The development and design of RF CMOS devices was enabled by van der Ziel's FET RF noise model, which was published in the early 1960s and remained largely forgotten until the 1990s.

== History ==
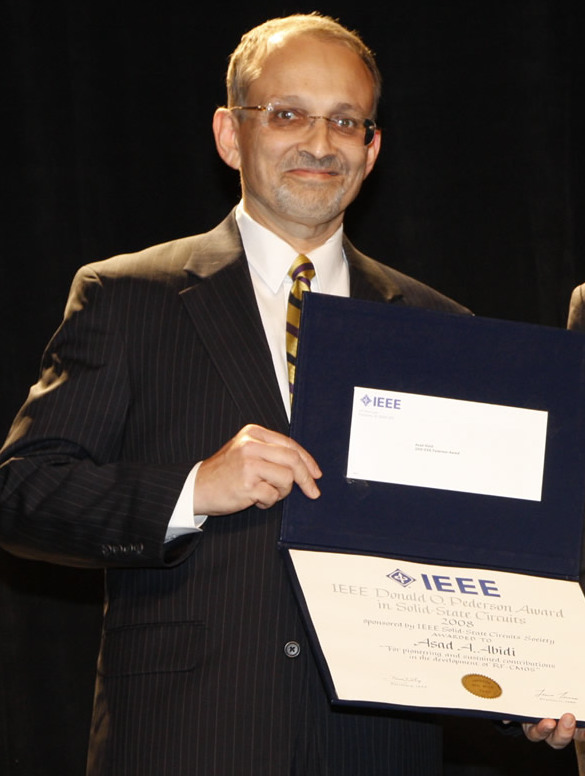
Asad Ali Abidi developed RF CMOS technology at UCLA during the late 1980s to early 1990s.

Pakistani engineer Asad Ali Abidi, while working at Bell Labs and then UCLA during the 1980s–1990s, pioneered radio research in metal–oxide–semiconductor (MOS) technology and made seminal contributions to radio architecture based on complementary MOS (CMOS) switched-capacitor (SC) technology. In the early 1980s, while working at Bell, he worked on the development of sub-micron MOSFET (MOS field-effect transistor) VLSI (very large-scale integration) technology, and demonstrated the potential of sub-micron NMOS integrated circuit (IC) technology in high-speed communication circuits. Abidi's work was initially met with skepticism from proponents of GaAs and bipolar junction transistors, the dominant technologies for high-speed communication circuits at the time. In 1985 he joined the University of California, Los Angeles (UCLA), where he pioneered RF CMOS technology during the late 1980s to early 1990s.

Abidi was researching analog CMOS circuits for signal processing and communications at UCLA during the late 1980s to early 1990s. Abidi, along with UCLA colleagues J. Chang and Michael Gaitan, demonstrated the first RF CMOS amplifier in 1993. In 1995, Abidi used CMOS switched-capacitor technology to demonstrate the first direct-conversion transceivers for digital communications. In the late 1990s, RF CMOS technology was widely adopted in wireless networking, as mobile phones began entering widespread use. This changed the way in which RF circuits were designed, leading to the replacement of discrete bipolar transistors with CMOS integrated circuits in radio transceivers. This allowed RF circuitry to be shrunk into small chips with associated lower cost and space requirements by means of integration, which led to widespread use of low cost, high bandwidth wireless devices, for example laptops and cell phones via cellular networks and WiFi, and Bluetooth-enabled devices.

There was a rapid growth of the telecommunications industry towards the end of the 20th century, primarily due to the introduction of digital signal processing in wireless communications, driven by the development of low-cost, very large-scale integration (VLSI) RF CMOS technology. It enabled sophisticated, low-cost and portable end-user terminals, and gave rise to small, low-cost, low-power and portable units for a wide range of wireless communication systems. This enabled "anytime, anywhere" communication and helped bring about the wireless revolution, leading to the rapid growth of the wireless industry.

In the early 2000s, RF CMOS chips with deep sub-micron MOSFETs capable of over 100 GHz frequency range were demonstrated. As of 2008, the radio transceivers in all wireless networking devices and modern mobile phones are mass-produced as RF CMOS devices.

== Applications ==
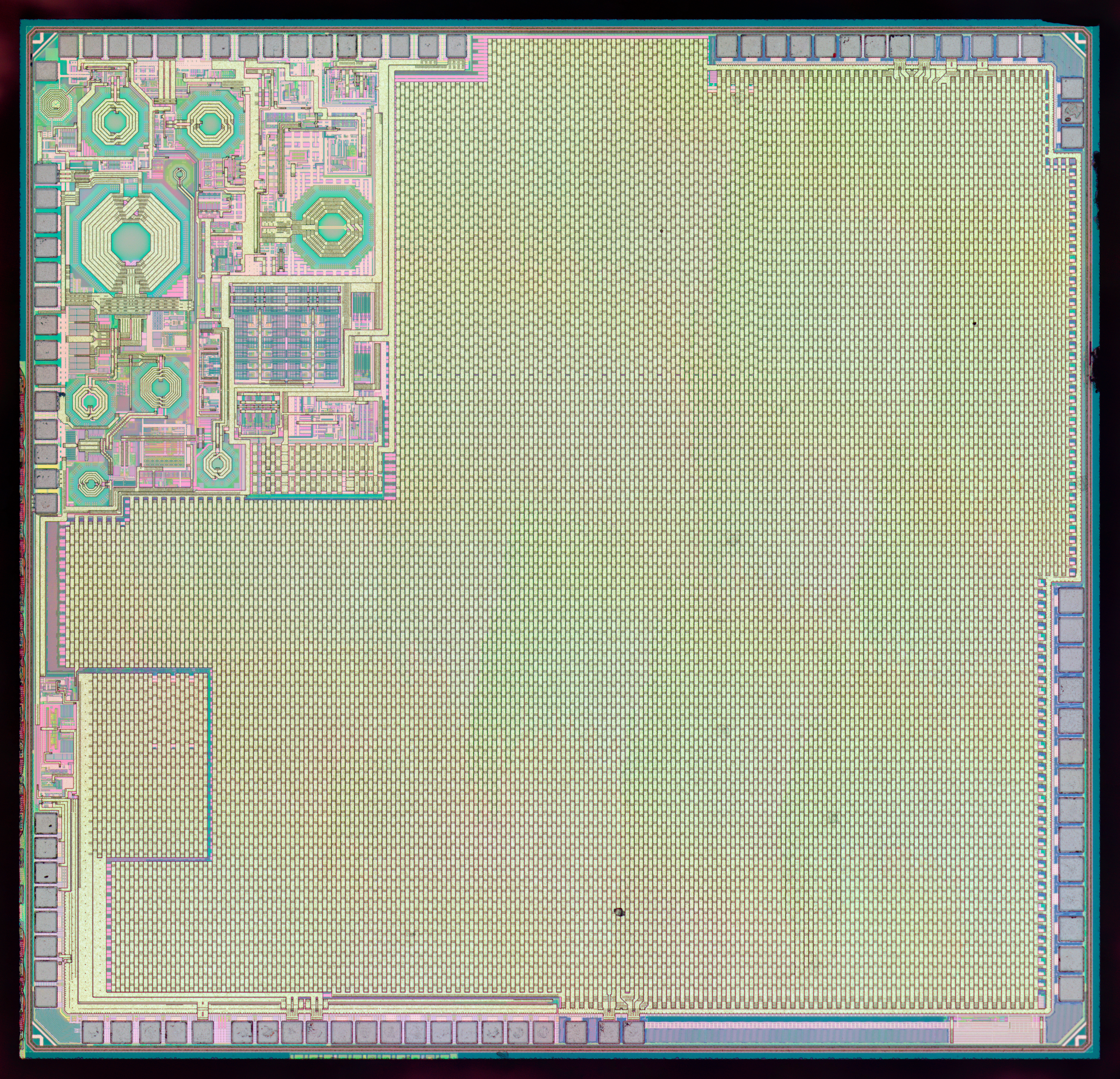
The ESP32 is an example of a chip combining RF CMOS with digital logic, which in this case is one or two processor cores that are hidden under the power delivery layer covering most of the image.

The baseband processors and radio transceivers in all modern wireless networking devices and mobile phones are mass-produced using RF CMOS devices. RF CMOS circuits are widely used to transmit and receive wireless signals, in a variety of applications, such as satellite technology (including GPS and GPS receivers), Bluetooth, Wi-Fi, near-field communication (NFC), mobile networks (such as 3G and 4G), terrestrial broadcast, and automotive radar applications, among other uses.

Examples of commercial RF CMOS chips include Intel's DECT cordless phone, and 802.11 (Wi-Fi) chips created by Atheros and other companies. Commercial RF CMOS products are also used for Bluetooth and Wireless LAN (WLAN) networks. RF CMOS is also used in the radio transceivers for wireless standards such as GSM, Wi-Fi, and Bluetooth, transceivers for mobile networks such as 3G, and remote units in wireless sensor networks (WSN).

RF CMOS technology is crucial to modern wireless communications, including wireless networks and mobile communication devices. One of the companies that commercialized RF CMOS technology was Infineon. Its bulk CMOS RF switches sells over 1 billion units annually, reaching a cumulative 5 billion units, as of 2018.

Practical software-defined radio (SDR) for commercial use was enabled by RF CMOS, which is capable of implementing an entire software-defined radio system on a single MOS IC chip. RF CMOS began to be used for SDR implementations during the 2000s.

=== Common applications ===
RF CMOS is widely used in a number of common applications, which include the following.

- Analog-to-digital converter (ADC) — sigma-delta (ΣΔ) modulation
- Automotive electronics — advanced driver-assistance systems (ADAS), automotive safety applications, driving efficiency, lane departure warning system (LDWS), vulnerable road user (VRU) detection, driver assistance, rear occupant detection (ROD), rear occupant alert (ROA), waveform generator
  - Car front-side — lateral collision avoidance system, narrow path assist, side pre-crash system, traffic jam assist, adaptive cruise control (ACC), autonomous emergency braking (AEB)
  - Car rear-side — blind spot detection (BSD), Rear Pre-Crash, lane change assistance (LCA)
  - Cross-Traffic Assist (CTA) technology — rear cross-traffic alert (RCTA), front cross-traffic alert (FTCA)
  - Parking — automated parking, automated parking system (APS), automatic parking, Parking Assist (PA), parking sensor (ultrasonic sensor)
  - Traffic collision technology — collision avoidance system (CAS), collision detection, Collision Warning and Brake Support, Collision Mitigation Avoidance System
  - Vehicle blind spot technology — blind spot detection (BSD), blind spot monitoring (BSM), rear cross-traffic alert (RCTA)
  - Vehicular communication systems — vehicle-to-vehicle (V2V) communication and vehicle-to-everything (V2X) communication
- Broadcasting technology — terrestrial broadcasting
  - Radio broadcasting — digital radio, HD Radio, Digital Audio Broadcasting (DAB), Digital Radio Mondiale (DRM)
- Mobile devices
  - Mobile networks — Global System for Mobile Communications (GSM), 3G, 4G, 5G
  - Mobile phones
  - Smartphones — cellular modems (baseband), RF transceivers, wireless communication chips (Wi-Fi, Bluetooth, GPS)
- Radio technology — radio-frequency (RF) technology, radio receivers, transmitters, software-defined radio (SDR), wideband
  - Baseband processors
  - Millimeter-wave (mmW) applications
  - Radar technology — automotive radar, radar transceivers, imaging radar, super-resolution (SR) imaging, radar cocooning with 360° perception, cocoon radar, Frequency Modulated Continuous Wave (FMCW) radar, corner radar functions, radar tracker
  - Transceivers — radio transceivers, RF transceivers, cellular transceivers
- Sensors — radar sensors, wireless sensor network (WSN)
- System-on-a-chip (SoC)
- Telecommunications
  - Digital Enhanced Cordless Telecommunications (DECT)
  - Internet of things (IoT) — Narrowband IoT, Cat-M1
  - Satellite communication — Global Positioning System (GPS), GPS receivers
  - Short-range devices — Bluetooth, Bluetooth Low Energy (BLE), IEEE 802.15.4, IEEE 802.11, Wi-Fi
  - Wireless networks — wireless networking devices, wireless local area network (WLAN), wide area network (WAN), mobile networks
  - Wireless technology — wireless telecommunications, backhaul, near-field communication (NFC)
- Voltage-controlled oscillator (VCO) — low phase noise VCO

== See also ==
- Digital telephony
- History of telecommunication
- LDMOS
- Mixed-signal integrated circuit
- MOS integrated circuit
- Power MOSFET
- Radio-frequency engineering
- RF module
- RF power amplifier
- RFIC
- Semiconductor device fabrication
