= IEEE Journal of Solid-State Circuits =

Journal

- Discipline: Engineering, solid-state circuit
- Language: English
- Edited by: Dennis Sylvester

Publication details
- History: September 1966–present
- Publisher: Institute of Electrical and Electronics Engineers
- Frequency: Monthly
- Open access: Hybrid
- Impact factor: 6.12 (2021)

Standard abbreviations
- ISO 4: IEEE J. Solid-State Circuits

Indexing
- ISSN: 0018-9200

Links
- Journal homepage

The IEEE Journal of Solid-State Circuits is a monthly peer-reviewed scientific journal on new developments and research in solid-state circuits, published by the Institute of Electrical and Electronics Engineers (IEEE) in New York City. The journal serves as a companion venue for expanding on work presented at the International Solid-State Circuits Conference, the Symposia on VLSI Technology and Circuits, and the Custom Integrated Circuits Conference. The journal has an impact factor of 6.12 and is edited by Dennis Sylvester (University of Michigan).
