= Ada Poon =

Professor of electrical engineering at Stanford University

- Education: University of California, Berkeley (PhD and MS), University of Hong Kong (BEng)
- Known for: Bioelectronics, wireless powering, wireless communication, integrated circuits, electromagnetics
- Awards: 2010 Okawa Foundation Research Grant, Chan Zuckerberg Biohub Investigator Award
- Scientific career
- Fields: Electrical engineering
- Thesis: Use of spatial dimension for spectrum sharing
- Doctoral advisor: Robert W. Brodersen

Ada Shuk Yan Poon is a professor of electrical engineering at Stanford University.

== Education, Career and Research ==
Ada Poon completed her undergraduate study in electrical and electronic engineering from the University of Hong Kong. She completed her M.S. (1999) and Ph.D. (2004) degrees from the EECS department at the University of California, Berkeley, supervised by Robert W. Brodersen.

In 2003, she joined Intel Corporation. In 2005, she joined her advisor's startup company, SiBeam Inc. In 2006, she joined the faculty of University of Illinois, Urbana-Champaign. She has been faculty at Stanford Department of Electrical Engineering since 2008.

Dr. Poon's research is creating new interfaces between electronics and living systems, from wearable and implantable sensing to cellular control and engineered biological function. Her work spans electromagnetics, circuits, sensing, and biology to reveal, shape, and restore the signals of life, and to build a future of Health AI powered by accessible sensors that continuously capture longitudinal data from each individual.

As of July 2019, Ada Poon has been granted approximately 11 patents.

== Recognition ==
Poon was named to the 2026 class of IEEE Fellows, "for contributions to wireless power transfer and implantable devices".
