= High Speed Serial Link =

High Speed Serial Link (HSSL) is a proprietary communications protocol and was primarily developed by Alcatel. It is now owned by Alcatel-Lucent.

Capable of transmitting data at rates up to 10 Gbit/s, HSSL is chiefly used in electronic system backplanes for inter-board communication.

Xilinx, among other integrated circuit vendors, currently supports the standard.
