= Victor Peng =

Taiwanese-American technology executive

- Born: Victor Wen-Ti Peng; 1960 (age 65–66); Taipei, Taiwan
- Citizenship: American
- Education: Rensselaer Polytechnic Institute (BE); Cornell University (ME)
- Occupations: CEO, PsiQuantum
- Years active: 1982-present
- Employer: PsiQuantum
- Spouse: Debbie
- Children: 3
- Website: www.psiquantum.com/about

Victor Peng

Victor Peng (born 1960) is a Taiwanese-American technology executive who currently works as Chief Executive Officer of PsiQuantum, an American quantum computing company developing fault-tolerant quantum computers. Peng was also the president of Adaptive and Embedded Computing Group at AMD. He was the CEO of Xilinx, an American technology company that supplies programmable logic devices before it was acquired by AMD. Peng currently serves as a member of the Board of Directors for KLA and Rambus.

== Career ==
Peng received a Bachelor of Engineering from Rensselaer Polytechnic Institute and a Master of Engineering degree in electrical engineering from Cornell University. He holds four U.S. patents about engineering apparatus and methods from his work at Act-Rx Technology Corporation and Digital Equipment Corporation.

Peng began his engineering career at Digital Equipment Corporation (DEC) in 1982. Then, from 1996 to 2008, he held several executive positions successively at Silicon Graphics, MIPS Technologies, Tzero Technologies, ATI and later AMD. He joined Xilinx in January 2008 and returned to AMD in 2022.

From 1998 to 2004, Peng led the development of graphics processing units (GPUs) and multimedia products at MIPS Technologies. He joined ATI in 2005 before it was acquired by AMD. Then, he was corporate vice president of the graphics products group (GPG) silicon engineering at AMD. He also led AMD's central silicon engineering team supporting graphics, console game products, CPU chipset and consumer business units. Peng was also corporate vice president of the graphics products group (GPG) silicon engineering at AMD until 2008.

Peng successively held several C-level executive positions at the Programmable Products Group at Xilinx. He was responsible for the development and delivery of Xilinx programmable platforms including silicon and enabling technologies. He led the Programmable Platforms Development from November 2008 until April 2012. The following year, Peng was the company senior vice president of programmable platforms group. From July 2014 to April 2017, Peng was senior vice president and general manager of products at Xilinx, Inc. He was chief operating officer at Xilinx from April 2017 and was appointed member of the board of directors in October of the same year. On January 29, 2018, he was appointed the fourth company CEO and succeeded Moshe Gavrielov as part of an official succession plan. In February 2022, Peng rejoined AMD as president, Adaptable and Embedded Computing Group with AMD’s acquisition of Xilinx. On July 22, 2024 AMD announced that Peng will retire from president position on August 30, 2024.

In February 2026, Peng was appointed Chief Executive Officer of PsiQuantum. At PsiQuantum, Peng oversees the company's operations, business strategy, and deployment efforts as it develops utility-scale quantum computing systems in Australia and the United States.

Peng currently serves as a member of the Board of Directors for KLA and Rambus.
