= Klaas Bult =

Dutch electrical engineer

Klaas Bult (born Marienberg, The Netherlands June 26, 1959) is a Dutch electrical engineer. He once worked for Broadcom Corporation.

Bult was named a Fellow of the Institute of Electrical and Electronics Engineers (IEEE) in 2014 for his contributions to the design of high frequency analog and mixed signal circuits.

== Awards ==
- 2020: IEEE Donald O. Pederson Award in Solid-State Circuits
