= Ross Freeman =

American inventor (1948–1989)

Ross Freeman (July 26, 1948 – October 22, 1989), was an American electrical engineer and inventor, and co-founder of the leading FPGA developer Xilinx.

== Early life and education ==
Freeman was born in the upper peninsula of Michigan on July 26, 1948. He grew up on a farm near Engadine, Michigan.

Freeman earned a BS degree in physics from Michigan State University in 1969 and a master’s from University of Illinois in 1971. He worked in the Peace Corps for several years, then went to Teletype Corporation to design a custom PMOS circuit.

== Founding of Xilinx ==
Ross postulated that because of Moore's Law, transistors would be getting less expensive each year, making customizable programmable chips affordable. The idea was "far out" at the time, but the company and technology grew quickly, eventually catching the attention of new-found competitors in what is now a mature industry.

With Bernard Vonderschmitt and James V Barnett II Freeman co-founded Xilinx in 1984, and a year later invented the first field-programmable gate array (FPGA). Freeman's invention - patent 4,870,302 - is a computer chip full of 'open gates' that engineers can reprogram as much as needed to add new functionality, adapt to changing standards or specifications and make last minute design changes.

== Death and legacy ==
Freeman died in 1989, only a few years after creating a new industry with the FPGA and launching what would become a multi-billion dollar company.

In 2006, 17 years after his death, Freeman was inducted into the National Inventor's Hall of Fame, which honors men and women responsible for fundamental technology advances for human, social and economic progress. That year was the integrated circuit's 50th anniversary so the hall of fame inductees were themed with inventions fundamental to modern computing.

To honor Freeman's memory, encourage technical innovation, and reward employees, Xilinx began a new tradition in 1992 of honoring a Xilinx employee each year with the Ross Freeman Award for Technical Innovation. Participants are nominated, finalists are chosen by a nomination committee at Xilinx and award winners are chosen by a vote from the company's technical staff.
