= Custom Integrated Circuits Conference =

IEEE Custom Integrated Circuits Conference (CICC) is an international conference devoted to IC development, showcasing original, first published technical work and circuit techniques that tackle practical problems. CICC is a forum for circuit, IC, and SoC designers, CAD developers, manufacturers and ASIC users to present and discuss new developments, future trends, innovative ideas and recent advancements. CICC is sponsored by the IEEE Solid-State Circuits Society and technically sponsored by the IEEE Electron Devices Society. The conference is held annually in either April or September in locations across the US.

== See also ==
- International Electron Devices Meeting (IEDM)
- International Solid-State Circuits Conference (ISSCC)
- Symposia on VLSI Technology and Circuits
