= Robert W. Brodersen =

American electrical engineer

Robert W. Brodersen (November 1, 1945 – February 1, 2024) was a professor emeritus of electrical engineering, and a founder of the Berkeley Wireless Research Center (BWRC) at the University of California, Berkeley.

Brodersen received his B.S. in electrical engineering and mathematics from California State Polytechnic University, Pomona, in 1966, his M.S. in electrical engineering from MIT in 1968, and his Ph.D. in electrical engineering from MIT in 1972. After working with Texas Instruments, he joined the faculty of the Electrical Engineering and Computer Science Department at Berkeley in 1976, where his research focused on low-power design and wireless communications, including ultra-wideband radio systems, multiple-carrier multiple-antenna algorithms, microwave CMOS radio design, and computer-aided design tools. He retired in 2006 as professor emeritus.

Brodersen was elected a member of the National Academy of Engineering in 1988 for pioneering contributions to very-large-scale integrated circuit design and to speech-processing technology. He was also an IEEE Fellow.

He received numerous awards, including the 1980 IEEE W.R.G. Baker Prize Paper Award, with Paul R. Gray and David A. Hodges the 1983 IEEE Morris N. Liebmann Memorial Award for "pioneering contributions and leadership in research on switched-capacitor circuits for analog-digital conversion and filtering", 1997 IEEE Solid-State Circuits Award for "contributions to the design of integrated circuits for signal processing systems", 1998 ACM SIGMOBILE Computing Award for his work on the InfoPad project (1992–1997), and 2000 IEEE Millennium Medal. In 1999 he received a Technologie Doctor Honoris Causa from Lund University in Sweden. In 2016, Brodersen was awarded the IEEE Edison Medal.

== Selected works ==
- (ed.) Anatomy of a Silicon Compiler. (1992). Kluwer Academic Pub. ISBN 0-7923-9249-3.
- Low-power CMOS Wireless Communications: A Wideband CDMA System Design. (1998). Kluwer Academic Pub. ISBN 0-7923-8085-1. Co-authored with Samuel Sheng.
- Energy Efficient Microprocessor Design. (2002). Kluwer Academic Pub. ISBN 0-7923-7586-6. Co-authored with Thomas D. Burd.
