= International Solid-State Circuits Conference =

International Solid-State Circuits Conference is a global forum for presentation of advances in solid-state circuits and Systems-on-a-Chip. The conference is held every year in February at the San Francisco Marriott Marquis in downtown San Francisco. ISSCC is sponsored by IEEE Solid-State Circuits Society.

According to The Register, "The ISSCC event is the second event of each new year, following the Consumer Electronics Show, where new PC processors and sundry other computing gadgets are brought to market."

== History of ISSCC ==
Early participants in the inaugural conference in 1954 belonged to the Institute of Radio Engineers (IRE) Circuit Theory Group and the IRE subcommittee of Transistor Circuits. The conference was held in Philadelphia and local chapters of IRE and American Institute of Electrical Engineers (AIEE) were in attendance. Later on AIEE and IRE would merge to become the present-day IEEE.

The first conference consisted of papers from six organizations: Bell Telephone Laboratories, General Electric, RCA, Philco, Massachusetts Institute of Technology and the University of Pennsylvania. The registration was $4 (early registration was $3) and 601 people registered. International attendees arrived from Canada, England and Japan. With subsequent conferences came many more international participants with the first international presentation in 1958. By 1965, the number of overseas program committee members increased to 8 and in 1970 the overseas members began meeting separately in both Europe and Japan. Selected members of these regional program committees would attend the final program meeting in America.

The name of the 1954 Conference appears in various publications and documents as: "The Transistor Conference", "The Conference on Transistor Circuits", "The Philadelphia Conference", or "The National Conference on Transistor Circuits". The current name "International Solid-State Circuits Conference" was settled by the organizers in 1960.

While ISSCC was founded in Philadelphia, in the mid-1960s the center of semiconductor development in the United States was shifting west. In 1978, the conference was held on alternate coasts with New York soon substituting for Philadelphia. In 1990, San Francisco became the Conference's permanent home.

In 2013, ISSCC celebrated its 60th anniversary and will had several special programs to celebrate 60 years of circuit and SoC innovation.

== Technical Program Committee ==
The Technical Program Committee (TPC) in early years was extremely fluid in order to deal with the constantly changing topics in the industry. By 1968 the list of subcommittees had settled to Digital, Analog (Linear), Microwave and Other, where the subcommittee members in Other would address the one-of-a-kind papers. In the 80's, the Microwave Subcommittee was dropped from the program as the overlap between the topics and attendees was diminishing. In addition, Digital split into Digital, Memory and Signal Processing subcommittees. In 1992, Emerging Technologies was launched and chartered to seek out the one-of-a-kind applications which may find a home in ISSCC. Today there are 10 subcommittees: Analog, Data Converters, Energy Efficient Digital (EED), High-Performance Digital (HPD), Imagers, MEMs, Medical and Displays (IMMD), Memory, RF, Technology Directions (formerly Emerging Technologies), Wireless and Wireline.

== TPC chairs ==
Year	Technical Program Chair	Affiliation	Year	Technical Program Chair	Affiliation	Year	Technical Program Chair	Affiliation
1954	J. Linvill	Bell Labs	1955	H. Tompkins	Burroughs Corp	1956	H. Woll	RCA Labs
1957	G. Royer	IBM	1958	R. Baker	MIT Lincoln Labs	1959	A. Stern	General Electric
1960	T. Finch	Bell Labs	1961	J. Suran	General Electric	1962	R. Adler	MIT
1963	S. Ghandhi	Philco Scientific Lab	1964	P. Myers	Marietta Corp	1965	G. Herzog	RCA Labs
1966	G. Herzog	RCA Labs	1967	R. Baker	MIT	1968	R. Petritz	Texas Instruments
1969	R. Engelbrecht	Bell Labs	1970	T. Bray	General Electric	1971	R. Webster	Texas Instruments
1972	S. Triebwasser	IBM Research	1973	V. Johannes	Bell Labs	1974	H. Sobol	Collins Radio
1975	W. Pricer	IBM	1976	J. Wuorinen	Bell Labs	1977	D. Hodges	Univ. of California
1978	J. Heightley	Sandia Labs	1979	W. Kosonocky	RCA Labs	1980	J. Plummer	Stanford Univ.
1981	B. Wooley	Bell Labs	1982	P. Gray	Univ. of California	1983	L. Terman	IBM Research
1984	P. Verhofstadt	Fairchild uProc. Div.	1985	H. Boll	Bell Labs	1986	A. Grebene	Micro Linear Corp
1987	R. Baertsch	General Electric	1988	W. Herndon	Fairchild Research Ctr.	1989	H. Mussman	AT&T Bell Labs
1990	C. Gwyn	Sandia Labs	1991	J. Trnka	IBM	1992	A. Shah	Texas Instruments
1993	R. Jaeger	Auburn Univ.	1994	D. Monticelli	National Semiconductor	1995	T. Tredwell	Eastman Kodak
1996	F. Hewlett	Sandia Labs	1997	R. Hester	Texas Instruments	1998	J. Cressler	Auburn Univ.
1999	S. Taylor	Triquent Semiconductor	2000	R. Crisp	Rambus, Inc.	2001	G. Gulak	Univ. of Toronto
2002	W. Sansen	KU Leuven	2003	A. Chandrakasan	MIT	2004	A. Kanuma	Toshiba
2005	I. Young	Intel	2006	J. Sevenhans	Consultant	2007	J. Van der Spiegel	Univ of Pennsylvania
2008	Y. Hagihara	Sony	2009	W. Bowhill	Intel	2010	A. Theuwissen	Harvest Imaging/ Delft Univ
2011	W. Gass	Texas Instruments	2012	H. Hidaka	Renesas Electronics	2013	B. Nauta	Univ of Twente

== European Committee Chairs ==
Year	European Chair	Affiliation	Year	European Chair	Affiliation	Year	European Chair	Affiliation
1971–1974	J. C. van Vessem	Philips	1975–1976	O. Folberth	IBM	1977–1979	N. C de Troye	Philips Research
1980–1983	H. H. Berger	IBM	1984–1985	J. Borel	Thomson EFCIS	1986–1988	J. Lohstroh	Philips Research
1989–1994	K. Hoffman	Univ. der Bundeswehr	1995–2002	R. van de Plassche	Philips Research	2003–2004	J. Sevenhans	Alcatel
2005–2006	A. Theuwissen	DALSA BV	2007–2008	R. Koch	Infineon Technologies	2009–2010	Q. Huang	ETH Zurich
2011	B. Nauta	Univ. Twente	2012–2013	A. Pärssinen	Renesas Mobile

== Far East Committee Chairs ==
Year	Far East Chair	Affiliation	Year	Far East Chair	Affiliation	Year	Far East Chair	Affiliation
1971–1972	T Sugano	Univ. of Tokyo	1973–1974	S Hamada	NTT	1975–1976	Y. Tarui	Electrotechnical Lab
1977–1978	M. Uenohara	Nippon Elect Co	1979–80	M. Watanabe	NTT	1981–1982	K. Kurokawa	Fujitsu
1983–1984	M. Nagata	Hitachi CRL	1985–1986	Y. Takeishi	Toshiba	1987–1988	H. Sasaki	NEC
1989–1990	T. Sudo	NTT	1991–1992	T. Nakano	Mitsubishi	1993–1994	H. Ishikawa	Fujitsu
1995–1996	G. Kano	Matsushita	1997–1998	M. Kubo	Hitachi	1999–2000	Y. Unno	Toshiba
2001–2002	H. Watanabe	NEC	2003–2004	Y. Hagiwara	Sony	2005–2006	K. Iizuka	Sharp
2007–2008	J. Chung	Pohang Univ of Science & Tech	2009–2010	T. Kawahara	Hitachi	2011–2012	H-J Yoo	Kaist
2013	M. Ikeda	Univ of Tokyo

== Executive committee ==
ISSCC is a strictly non-profit organization run by the executive committee. From formative years through 1980 the Conference chair was usually filled by the previous year's Program Chair. To provide needed continuity, the term of Conference Chair was extended to at least 5 years.

== Conference Chairs ==
Year	Conference Chair	Affiliation	Year	Conference Chair	Affiliation	Year	Conference Chair	Affiliation
1954	I. Wolf	RCA	1955	D. Fink	Philco	1956	G. Haller	General Electric
1957	A. Samuel	IBM	1958	J. Mulligan Jr	New York University	1959	J. Morton	Bell Labs
1960	A. Stern	General Electric	1961	T. Finch	Bell Labs	1962	J. Suran	General Electric
1963	F. Blecher	Bell Labs	1964	E. Johnson	RCA	1965	J. Angell	Stanford Univ.
1966, 1969	J. Meindl	US Army Electronics Cmd., Stanford Univ.	1967–1968	J. Mayo	Bell Labs	1970	R. Engelbrecht	Bell Labs
1971, 1980–1987	J. Raper	General Electric	1972	R. Webster	Texas Instruments	1973	S. Triebwasser	IBM Research
1974	V. Johannes	Bell Labs	1975	H. Sobol	Collins Radio	1976, 1988–1996	W. Pricer	IBM
1977	J. Wuorinen	Bell Labs	1978	D. Hodges	Univ. of California	1979	J. Heightley	Sandia Labs
1997–2001	J. Trnka	IBM	2002-2007	T. Tredwell	Eastman Kodak, Carestream Health	2010-2018	A. Chandrakasan	MIT
2019-2020	J. Van der Spiegel	University of Pennsylvania	2021-	K. Zhang	TSMC

== See also ==
- Custom Integrated Circuits Conference
- Hot Chips
- International Electron Devices Meeting
- Symposia on VLSI Technology and Circuits
